This is a list of Southern African trees, shrubs, suffrutices, geoxyles and lianes, and is intended to cover Angola, Botswana, Eswatini, Lesotho, Malawi, Mozambique, Namibia, South Africa, Zambia and Zimbabwe.

The notion of 'indigenous' is of necessity a blurred concept, and is clearly a function of both time and political boundaries. The global distribution of plants useful to humans, or inadvertently transported by them, is closely linked to a mapping of their journeys and settlements, and the movement of species in prehistoric times must be inferred from archaeological and palaeontological remains, centers of diversity, DNA samples and other sources.

Cyatheaceae
 Cyathea capensis (L.f.) J.E. Sm. (Hemitelia capensis Kaulf.)
 Cyathea dregei Kunze (Alsophila dregei (Kunze) R.M. Tryon)
 Cyathea manniana Hook.
 Alsophila thomsonii (Baker) R.M. Tryon (Cyathea thomsonii Baker)

Blechnaceae
 Lomariocycas tabularis (Thunb.) Kuhn

Cycadaceae
 Cycas thouarsii R.Br.

Zamiaceae

 Encephalartos aemulans Vorster
 Encephalartos altensteinii Lehm.
 Encephalartos cupidus R.A. Dyer
 Encephalartos dolomiticus Lavranos & D.L. Goode
 Encephalartos eugene-maraisii Verdoorn
 Encephalartos ferox Bertol.f.
 Encephalartos friderici-guilielmi Lehm.
 Encephalartos ghellinckii Lem.
 Encephalartos heenanii R.A. Dyer
 Encephalartos hirsutus P.J.H.Hurter
 Encephalartos humilis Verdoorn
 Encephalartos inopinus R.A. Dyer
 Encephalartos lanatus Stapf & Burtt Davy
 Encephalartos laevifolius Stapf & Burtt Davy
 Encephalartos latifrons Lehm.
 Encephalartos lebomboensis Verdoorn
 Encephalartos lehmannii Lehm.
 Encephalartos longifolius (Jacq.) Lehm.
 Encephalartos manikensis (Gilliland) Gilliland
 Encephalartos middelburgensis Vorster, Robbertse & S.van der Westh.
 Encephalartos natalensis R.A. Dyer & Verdoorn
 Encephalartos paucidentatus Stapf & Burtt Davy
 Encephalartos princeps R.A. Dyer
 Encephalartos schmitzii Malaisse
 Encephalartos transvenosus Stapf & Burtt Davy
 Encephalartos umbeluziensis R.A. Dyer
 Encephalartos villosus Lem.
 Encephalartos woodii Sander

Podocarpaceae

 Afrocarpus falcatus (Thunb.) C.N.Page
 Podocarpus elongatus L'Herit. ex Pers.
 Podocarpus henkelii Stapf ex Dallim. & Jacks.
 Podocarpus latifolius (Thunb.) R.Br. ex Mirb.
 Podocarpus milanjianus Rendle

Cupressaceae
 Widdringtonia nodiflora (L.) Powrie (Widdringtonia cupressoides (L.) Endl.)
 Widdringtonia schwarzii (Marloth) Mast.
 Widdringtonia wallichii Endl. ex Carrière (Widdringtonia cedarbergensis J.A.Marsh)
 Widdringtonia whytei Rendle
 Juniperus procera Hochst. ex Endl.

Welwitschiaceae
 Welwitschia mirabilis Hook.f. (Welwitschia bainesii (Hook.f.) Carr.)

Poaceae
 Thamnocalamus tessellatus (Nees) Soderstrom & R.P.Ellis (Arundinaria tessellata)
 Oreobambos buchwaldii K.Schum.
 Oxytenanthera abyssinica (A.Rich.) Munro

Pandanaceae
 Pandanus livingstonianus Rendle

Arecaceae
 Phoenix reclinata Jacq.
 Hyphaene coriacea Gaertn. (Hyphaene natalensis Kunze, Hyphaene crinita)
 Hyphaene petersiana Klotzsch ex Mart. (Hyphaene benguelensis Welw. ex H.Wendl.) (Hyphaene ventricosa J.Kirk)
 Borassus aethiopum Mart.
 Raphia australis Oberm. & Strey
 Raphia farinifera (Gaertn.) Hyl.
 Jubaeopsis caffra Becc.

Araceae
 Culcasia scandens P.Beauv.

Flagellariaceae
 Flagellaria guineensis Schumach.

Asphodelaceae

 Aloe africana Mill.
 Aloe alooides (H. Bol.) V. Druten
 Aloe angelica Pole-Evans
 Aloe arborescens Mill. (Aloe mutabilis Pillans)
 Aloe cameronii Hemsl.
 Aloe castanea Schonl.
 Aloe comosa Marloth & Berger
 Aloe dolomitica Groenewald
 Aloe excelsa Berger
 Aloe ferox Mill. (Aloe candelabrum Berger)
 Aloe khamiensis Pillans
 Aloe littoralis Bak.
 Aloe marlothii Berger (Aloe spectabilis Reynolds)
 Aloe munchii Christian
 Aloe pearsonii Schönland
 Aloe pluridens Haw.
 Aloe pretoriensis Pole-Evans
 Aloe rupestris Bak.
 Aloe sessiliflora Pole-Evans
 Aloe speciosa Bak.
 Aloe spectabilis Reynolds
 Aloe thraskii Bak.
 Aloidendron barberae (Dyer) Klopper & Gideon F.Sm. (Aloe barberae Dyer, Aloe bainesii Dyer)
 Aloidendron dichotomum (Masson) Klopper & Gideon F.Sm.
 Aloidendron pillansii (L.Guthrie) Klopper & Gideon F.Sm.
 Aloidendron ramosissimum (Pillans) Klopper & Gideon F.Sm.
 Kumara plicatilis (L.) G.D.Rowley

Asparagaceae

 Asparagus falcatus L.
 Asparagus longicladus N.E.Br.
 Dracaena aletriformis (Haw.) Bos (Dracaena hookeriana K. Koch)
 Dracaena camerooniana Baker
 Dracaena laxissima Engl.
 Dracaena mannii Bak. (Dracaena usambarensis Engl., Dracaena reflexa var. nitens (Welw. ex Baker) Baker)
 Dracaena reflexa Lam.
 Dracaena steudneri Engl.
 Dracaena transvaalensis Baker

Philesiaceae
 Behnia reticulata (Thunb.) Didr.

Smilacaceae
 Smilax anceps Willd. (Smilax kraussiana Meisn.)

Velloziaceae

 Xerophyta clavata Bak.
 Xerophyta equisetoides Baker
 Xerophyta retinervis Bak. var. equisetoides (Bak.)
 Xerophyta retinervis Bak. var. retinervis
 Xerophyta villosa (Bak.) Dur. & Schinz

Musaceae
 Ensete ventricosum (Welw.) E.E. Cheesm.
 Strelitzia alba (L.f.) Skeels
 Strelitzia caudata R.A. Dyer
 Strelitzia nicolai Regel & Koern.

Piperaceae
 Piper capense L.f.
 Piper guineense Schumach. & Thonn.

Salicaceae
 Salix hirsuta Thunb.
 Salix mucronata Thunb. subsp. capensis (Thunb.) Immelman (Salix capensis Thunb.)
 Salix wilmsii Seemen
 Salix woodii Seemen
 Oncoba bukobensis (Gilg) S. Hul & Breteler (Lindackeria bukobensis Gilg)
 Oncoba spinosa Forsk.
 Scolopia flanaganii (H. Bol.) Sim
 Scolopia mundii (Eckl. & Zeyh.) Warb.
 Scolopia oreophila (Sleumer) Killick
 Scolopia stolzii Gilg
 Scolopia zeyheri (Nees) Harv.
 Pseudoscolopia polyantha Gilg
 Homalium abdessammadii Aschers. & Schweinf.
 Homalium chasei Wild
 Homalium dentatum (Harv.) Warb.
 Homalium rufescens Benth.
 Bivinia jalbertii Tul.
 Trimeria grandifolia (Hochst.) Warb.
 Trimeria trinervis Harv.
 Ludia mauritiana J.F. Gmel.
 Flacourtia indica (Burm.f.) Merr.
 Dovyalis caffra (Hook.f. & Harv.) Hook.f.
 Dovyalis hispidula Wild
 Dovyalis longspina (Harv.) Warb.
 Dovyalis lucida Sim
 Dovyalis macrocalyx (Oliv.) Warb.
 Dovyalis rhamnoides (Burch. ex DC.) Harv.
 Dovyalis rotundifolia (Thunb.) Harv.
 Dovyalis xanthocarpa Bullock
 Dovyalis zeyheri (Sond.) Warb.
 Casearia battiscombei R.E.Fr.
 Casearia gladiiformis Mast.

Myricaceae
 Myrica conifera Burm.f.
 Morella brevifolia (E. Mey. ex C. DC.) Killick
 Morella integra (A. Chev.) Killick (Myrica integra (A. Chev.) Killick)
 Morella microbracteata (Weim.) Verdc. & Polhill
 Morella pilulifera (Rendle) Killick (Myrica pilulifera Rendle)
 Morella salicifolia (Hochst. ex A. Rich.) Verdc. & Polhill (Myrica salicifolia Hochst. ex A. Rich.)
 Morella serrata (Lam.) Killick  (Myrica serrata Lam.)

Cannabaceae
 Celtis africana Burm.f.
 Celtis gomphophylla Baker (Celtis durandii)
 Celtis mildbraedii Engl.
 Trema orientalis (L.) Blume (Trema guineense (Schumach. & Thonn.) Ficalho)
 Chaetachme aristata Planch.

Moraceae

 Treculia africana Decne. ex Trécul
 Morus mesozygia Stapf
 Maclura africana (Bureau) Corner (Cardiogyne africana Bureau)
 Milicia excelsa (Welw.) C.C.Berg (Chlorophora excelsa (Welw.) Benth.)
 Trilepisium madagascariense DC. (Bosquiea phoberos Thouars ex Baill.)
 Ficus abutilifolia (Miq.) Miq. (Ficus soldanella Warb.)
 Ficus asperifolia Miq.
 Ficus barteri Sprague
 Ficus bizanae Hutch. & Burtt Davy
 Ficus brachylepis Welw. ex Hiern
 Ficus bubu Warb.
 Ficus burtt-davyi Hutch.
 Ficus bussei Warb. ex Mildbr. & Burret (Ficus zambesiaca Hutch.)
 Ficus capreifolia Del.
 Ficus cordata Thunb. subsp. salicifolia (Vahl) Berg (Ficus pretoriae Burtt Davy)
 Ficus craterostoma Warb. ex Mildbr. & Burr.
 Ficus cyathistipula Warb.
 Ficus depauperata Sim
 Ficus dicranostyla Mildbr.
 Ficus exasperata Vahl
 Ficus fischeri Warb. ex Mildbr. & Burr. (Ficus kiloneura Hornby)
 Ficus glumosa (Miq.) Del. (Ficus sonderi Miq.)
 Ficus ilicina (Sond.) Miq.
 Ficus ingens (Miq.) Miq.
 Ficus laurifolia Lam. (Ficus brachypoda Hutch.)
 Ficus lutea Vahl (Ficus vogelii (Miq.) Miq., Ficus quibeba Welw. ex Fical., Ficus nekbudu Warb.)
 Ficus natalensis Hochst.
 Ficus nigropunctata Warb. ex Mildbr. & Burret
 Ficus polita Vahl
 Ficus pygmaea Welw. ex Hiern
 Ficus rokko Warb. & Schweinf. (Ficus thonningii pp sensu C.C.Berg)
 Ficus sansibarica Warb.
 Ficus scassellatii Pamp. (Ficus kirkii Hutch.)
 Ficus stuhlmannii Warb.
 Ficus sur Forssk. (Ficus capensis Thunb.)
 Ficus sycomorus L.
 Ficus tettensis Hutch. (Ficus smutsii Verdoorn)
 Ficus thonningii Bl. (Ficus petersii Warb.) (Ficus burkei (Miq.) Miq.) (Ficus rhodesiaca Warb. ex Mildbr. & Burret) (Ficus persicifolia Welw. ex Warb.) (Ficus dekdekena (Miq.) A.Rich.)
 Ficus tremula Warb.
 Ficus trichopoda Bak. (Ficus hippopotami Gerstn.) (Ficus congensis Engl.)
 Ficus vallis-choudae Delile
 Ficus verruculosa Warb.
 Ficus wakefieldii Hutch.

Urticaceae
 Myrianthus arboreus P.Beauv.
 Myrianthus holstii Engl.
 Obetia carruthersiana (Hiern) Rendle
 Obetia tenax (N.E. Br.) Friis (Urera tenax N.E. Br.)
 Pouzolzia mixta Solms (Pouzolzia hypoleuca Wedd.)
 Urera cameroonensis Wedd.
 Urera hypselodendron (Hochst. ex A.Rich.) Wedd.
 Urera trinervis (Hochst apud Krauss) Friis & Immelman

Proteaceae

 Brabejum stellatifolium L.
 Mimetes arboreus Rourke
 Mimetes argenteus Salisb. ex Knight
 Mimetes fimbriifolius Salisb. ex Knight
 Faurea forficuliflora Baker
 Faurea galpinii Phill.
 Faurea intermedia Engl. & Gilg
 Faurea macnaughtonii Phill.
 Faurea rochetiana (A.Rich.) Chiov. ex Pic.Serm. (Faurea speciosa (Welw.) Welw.)
 Faurea saligna Harv.
 Protea abyssinica Willd.
 Protea angolensis Welw.
 Protea aurea (Burm. f.) Rourke
 Protea caffra Meisn. (Protea rhodantha Hook.f., Protea multibracteata Phill.)
 Protea comptonii Beard
 Protea coronata Lam.
 Protea curvata N.E. Br.
 Protea eximia (Salisb. ex Knight) Fourc.
 Protea gaguedi Gmel.
 Protea gazensis Beard
 Protea glabra Thunb.
 Protea heckmanniana Engl.
 Protea homblei De Wild.
 Protea lacticolor Salisb.
 Protea laetans L.E. Davidson
 Protea lanceolata E. Mey. ex Meisn.
 Protea laurifolia Thunb.
 Protea lepidocarpodendron (L.) L.
 Protea lorifolia (Salisb. ex Knight) Fourc.
 Protea madiensis Oliv.
 Protea magnifica Link
 Protea micans subsp. trichophylla (Engl. & Gilg) Chisumpa & Brummitt (Protea trichophylla Engl. & Gilg)
 Protea mundii Klotzsch
 Protea neriifolia R. Br.
 Protea nitida Mill. (Protea arborea Houtt.)
 Protea obtusifolia De Wild.
 Protea paludosa (Hiern) Engl.
 Protea petiolaris (Hiern) Baker & C.H.Wright
 Protea punctata Meisn.
 Protea repens L.
 Protea roupelliae Meisn.
 Protea rubropilosa Beard
 Protea rupestris R.E.Fr.
 Protea rupicola Mund ex Meisn.
 Protea subvestita N.E. Br.
 Protea susannae Phill.
 Protea welwitschii Engl. (Protea hirta Klotzsch)
 Leucospermum conocarpodendron (L.) Buek
 Leucospermum cuneiforme (Burm.f) Rourke
 Leucospermum gerrardii Stapf.
 Leucospermum patersonii Phill.
 Leucospermum praemorsum (Meisn.) Phill.
 Leucospermum reflexum Buek ex Meissn.
 Leucospermum rodolentum (Salisb. ex Knight) Rourke
 Leucospermum saxosum S. Moore
 Leucadendron argenteum (L.) R. Br.
 Leucadendron conicum (Lam.) I.A. Williams
 Leucadendron coniferum (L.) Meisn.
 Leucadendron discolor Phill. & Hutch.
 Leucadendron ericifolium R. Br.
 Leucadendron eucalyptifolium Buek ex Meisn.
 Leucadendron microcephalum Gand. & Schinz (Leucadendron stokoei Phillips)
 Leucadendron nobile I. Williams
 Leucadendron pondoense Van Wyk
 Leucadendron procerum (Salisb. ex Knight) I. Williams
 Leucadendron pubescens R. Br.
 Leucadendron salicifolium (Salisb.) I. Williams
 Leucadendron strobilinum (L.) Druce

Santalaceae

 Colpoon compressum Berg.
 Osyris lanceolata Hochst. & Steud.
 Osyridicarpos schimperanus (Hochst. ex A. Rich.) A.DC.
 Thesium procerum N.E. Br.

Opiliaceae
 Opilia amentacea Roxb. (Opilia celtidifolia (Guill. & Perr.) Endl. ex Walp.)
 Opilia campestris Engl.
 Pentarhopalopilia marquesii (Engl.) Hiepko

Olacaceae
 Olax dissitiflora Oliv.
 Olax gambecola Baill.
 Olax obtusifolia De Wild.
 Ptychopetalum cuspidatum R.E.Fr.
 Ximenia americana L.
 Ximenia americana L. var. microphylla Welw.
 Ximenia caffra Sond.
 Ximenia caffra Sond. var. natalensis Sond.
 Strombosia scheffleri Engl.

Polygonaceae
 Afrobrunnichia erecta (Asch.) Hutch. & Dalziel

Aristolochiaceae
 Aristolochia albida Duch. (Aristolochia petersiana Klotzsch)
 Aristolochia littoralis Parodi (Aristolochia elegans Mast.)

Chenopodiaceae
 Salsola aphylla L. f.
 Salsola arborea C.A. Sm. ex Aell.
 Salsola etoshensis Botsch.

Amaranthaceae
 Atriplex vestita (Thunb.) Aellen
 Sericorema remotiflora (Hook.f.) Lopr.
 Arthraerua leubnitziae (Kuntze) Schinz
 Calicorema capitata (Moq.) Hook.f.
 Hermbstaedtia glauca Reichb. ex Steud.
 Leucosphaera bainesii (Hook.f.) Gilg
 Suaeda articulata Aellen
 Suaeda plumosa Aellen

Nyctaginaceae
 Phaeoptilum spinosum Radlk.
 Pisonia aculeata L.

Phytolaccaceae
 Phytolacca dodecandra L'Herit.

Aizoaceae
 Stoeberia beetzii (Dinter) Dinter & Schwant
 Tetragonia reduplicata Welw. ex Oliv.
 Tetragonia schenkii Schinz

Portulacaceae
 Portulacaria afra Jacq.
 Ceraria carrissoana Exell & Mendonça
 Ceraria fruticulosa H.Pearson & Stephens
 Ceraria longipedunculata Merxm. & Podlech
 Ceraria namaquensis (Sond.) Pearson & Stephens

Ranunculaceae
 Clematis brachiata Thunb. (Clematis oweniae Harv.)
 Clematis commutata Kuntze (Clematis iringaensis Engl.)
 Clematis thalictrifolia Engl.
 Clematis welwitschii Hiern ex Kuntze

Menispermaceae
 Cocculus hirsutus (L.) Diels
 Antizoma angustifolia (Burch.) Miers
 Tiliacora funifera (Miers) Oliv.
 Tinospora caffra (Miers) Troupin
 Tinospora fragosa (Verdoorn) Verdoorn & Troupin
 Tinospora tenera Miers

Annonaceae

 Annona cherimola Mill.
 Annona senegalensis Pers.
 Annona stenophylla Engl. & Diels
 Artabotrys brachypetalus Benth.
 Artabotrys collinus Hutch.
 Artabotrys monteiroae Oliv. (Artabotrys stolzii Diels)
 Artabotrys parviflora (A. Rich.) Benth.
 Hexalobus monopetalus (A. Rich.) Engl. & Diels
 Monodora junodii Engl. & Diels
 Monodora stenopetala Oliv.
 Monanthotaxis caffra (Sond.) Verdc. (Popowia caffra)
 Monanthotaxis parvifolia (Oliv.) Verdc. (Popowia oliveriana Exell & Mendonça)
 Monanthotaxis schweinfurthii (Engl. & Diels) Verdc. (Enneastemon schweinfurthii (Engl. & Diels) Robyns & Ghesq.)
 Friesodielsia obovata (Benth.) Verdc. (Popowia obovata Engl. & Diels)
 Sphaerocoryne gracilis (Engl. & Diels) Verdc. (Popowia gracilis Engl. & Diels)
 Uvaria angolensis Welw. ex Oliv.
 Uvaria caffra E. Mey ex Sond.
 Uvaria edulis N.Robson
 Uvaria gracilipes  N.Robson
 Uvaria lucida Benth. subsp. virens (N.E. Br.) Verdc.
 Uvaria welwitschii (Hiern) Engl. & Diels
 Uvariastrum hexaloboides (R.E. Fr.) R.E. Fr.
 Uvariopsis congensis Robyns & Ghesq.
 Cleistochlamys kirkii (Benth.) Oliv.
 Melodorum gracile (Engl. & Diels) Verdc.
 Xylopia aethiopica (Dunal) A.Rich.
 Xylopia katangensis De Wild.
 Xylopia longipetala De Wild. & T.Durand (Xylopia parviflora (A. Rich.) Benth.)
 Xylopia odoratissima Welw. ex Oliv.
 Xylopia rubescens Oliv.
 Xylopia tomentosa Exell

Myristicaceae
 Pycnanthus angolensis (Welw.) Warb.

Trimeniaceae (Monimiaceae)
 Xymalos monospora (Harv.) Baill.

Lauraceae

 Cryptocarya angustifolia E. Mey. ex Meisn.
 Cryptocarya latifolia Sond.
 Cryptocarya liebertiana Engl.
 Cryptocarya myrtifolia Stapf
 Cryptocarya natalensis (Ross) Kosterm. (Beilschmiedia natalensis J.H.Ross) (Dahlgrenodendron natalense (J.H. Ross) J. v.d. Merwe & A.E. v. Wyk)
 Cryptocarya transvaalensis Burtt Davy
 Cryptocarya woodii Engl.
 Cryptocarya wyliei Stapf
 Ocotea bullata (Burch.) E. Meyer in Drege
 Ocotea kenyensis (Chiov.) Robyns & Wilczek
 Ocotea usambarensis Engl.

Hernandiaceae
 Gyrocarpus americanus Jacq.

Capparaceae

 Bachmannia woodii (Oliv.) Gilg
 Boscia albitrunca (Burch.) Gilg & Ben. var. albitrunca
 Boscia angustifolia A. Rich. var. corymbosa (Gilg) De Wolf
 Boscia foetida Schinz
 Boscia foetida Schinz subsp. longipedicellata (Gilg) Tölken
 Boscia foetida Schinz subsp. rehmanniana (Pest.) Tölken
 Boscia microphylla Oliv.
 Boscia mossambicensis Klotzsch
 Boscia oleoides (Burch. ex DC.) Tölken (Capparis oleoides)
 Boscia salicifolia Oliv.
 Boscia tomentosa Tölken
 Cadaba aphylla (Thunb.) Wild.
 Cadaba kirkii Oliv.
 Cadaba natalensis Sond.
 Cadaba schroeppelii Suess.
 Cadaba termitaria N.E. Br.
 Capparis erythrocarpos Isert
 Capparis fascicularis DC.
 Capparis fascicularis var. elaeagnoides (Gilg) DeWolf (Capparis elaeagnoides Gilg)
 Capparis fascicularis var. zeyheri (Turcz.) Toelken
 Capparis hereroensis Schinz
 Capparis rosea (Klotzsch) Oliv.
 Capparis sepiaria L. var. citrifolia (Lam.) Tölken
 Capparis sepiaria L. var. subglabra (Oliv.) De Wolf
 Capparis tomentosa Lam.
 Cladostemon kirkii (Oliv.) Pax & Gilg
 Maerua angolensis DC.
 Maerua brevipetiolata Killick
 Maerua bussei R. Wilczek
 Maerua cafra (DC.) Pax
 Maerua cerasicarpa Gilg
 Maerua decumbens (Brongn.) DeWolf (Courbonia glauca Gilg & Benedict)
 Maerua edulis (Gilg. & Ben.) De Wolf
 Maerua endlichii Gilg & Bened.
 Maerua friesii Gilg & Gilg-Ben.
 Maerua gilgii (Schinz)
 Maerua juncea Pax subsp. crustata (Wild) Wild
 Maerua kirkii F. White
 Maerua nervosa (Hochst.) Oliv.
 Maerua parvifolia Pax
 Maerua prittwitzii Gilg & Gilg-Ben.
 Maerua pubescens Müll.Berol.
 Maerua racemulosa (A. DC.) Gilg & Ben.
 Maerua rosmarinoides (Sond.) Gilg & Ben.
 Maerua schinzii Pax
 Thilachium africanum Lour.
 Ritchiea albersii Gilg
 Ritchiea insignis (Pax) Gilg
 Ritchiea gossweileri Exell & Mendonça

Moringaceae
 Moringa ovalifolia Dinter & A.Berger

Crassulaceae
 Cotyledon orbiculata L.
 Tylecodon paniculatus (L.f.) Toelken
 Tylecodon wallichii (Harv.) Toelken
 Crassula arborescens (Mill.) Willd.
 Crassula ovata (Mill.) Druce (Crassula portulacea)
 Crassula sarcocaulis Eckl. & Zeyh. (Crassula parvisepala Schonl.)

Montiniaceae
 Montinia caryophyllacea Thunb.

Iteaceae
 Choristylis rhamnoides Harv.

Pittosporaceae
 Pittosporum viridiflorum Sims

Cunoniaceae

 Cunonia capensis L.
 Platylophus trifoliatus (L. f.) D. Don

Myrothamnaceae
 Myrothamnus flabellifolia Welw.

Bruniaceae
 Berzelia intermedia (D.Dietr.) Schltdl.
 Brunia nodiflora L.
 Raspalia trigyna (Schtr.) Duemmer

Hamamelidaceae
 Trichocladus crinitus (Thunb.) Pers.
 Trichocladus ellipticus Eckl. & Zeyh.
 Trichocladus ellipticus Eckl. & Zeyh. subsp. malosanus (Baker) Verdc.
 Trichocladus grandiflorus Oliv.

Rosaceae
 Hagenia abyssinica (Bruce ex Steud.) J.F.Gmel.
 Leucosidea sericea Eckl. & Zeyh.
 Cliffortia arborea Marloth
 Cliffortia grandifolia Eckl. & Zeyh.
 Cliffortia linearifolia Eckl. & Zeyh.
 Cliffortia nitidula (Engl.) R.E. & Th. Fries
 Cliffortia repens Schltr.
 Cliffortia serpyllifolia Cham. & Schlechtd.
 Cliffortia strobilifera L.
 Prunus africana (Hook. f.) Kalkm.

Chrysobalanaceae
 Parinari capensis Harv.
 Parinari curatellifolia Planch. ex Benth.
 Parinari excelsa Sabine
 Maranthes floribunda (Baker) F.White (Parinari polyandra subsp. floribunda (Baker) R.A.Graham)
 Maranthes goetzeniana (Engl.) Prance
 Magnistipula butayei subsp. bangweolensis (R.E.Fr.) F.White (Hirtella bangweolensis (R.E.Fr.) Greenway)
 Chrysobalanus icaco subsp. atacorensis (A.Chev.) F.White

Connaraceae
 Cnestis polyphylla Lam. (Cnestis natalensis (Hochst.) Planch. & Sond.)
 Rourea minor (Gaertn.) Alston (Santaloides afzelii (R.Br. ex Planch.) G.Schellenb.)
 Rourea orientalis Baill. (Byrsocarpus orientalis (Baill.) Baker)
 Rourea thomsonii (Baker) Jongkind (Jaundea pinnata (P.Beauv.) G.Schellenb.
 Agelaea pentagyna (Lam.) Baill. (Agelaea heterophylla Gilg) (Agelaea ugandensis Schellenb.)
 Burttia prunoides Baker f. & Exell

Mimosaceae

 Albizia adianthifolia (Schumach.) W.F. Wight
 Albizia amara (Roxb.) Boiv. subsp. sericocephala (Benth.) Brenan
 Albizia anthelmintica (A. Rich.) Brongn.
 Albizia antunesiana Harms
 Albizia brevifolia Schinz (Albizia rogersii Burtt Davy)
 Albizia forbesii Benth.
 Albizia glaberrima (Schum. & Thonn.) Benth.
 Albizia gummifera (J.F.Gmel.) C.A.Sm. (Albizia fastigiata (E. Mey.) Oliv.)
 Albizia harveyi Fourn.
 Albizia petersiana (Bolle) Oliv.
 Albizia schimperiana Oliv.
 Albizia suluensis Gerstn.
 Albizia tanganyicensis Baker f.
 Albizia versicolor Welw. ex Oliv.
 Albizia zimmermannii Harms
 Faidherbia albida (Del.) A. Chev. (Acacia albida Del.)
 Acacia abyssinica Benth.
 Acacia adenocalyx Brenan & Exell
 Acacia amythethophylla A.Rich. (Acacia macrothyrsa Harms)
 Acacia arenaria Schinz
 Acacia ataxacantha DC.
 Acacia borleae Burtt Davy
 Acacia brevispica var. dregeana (Benth.) Ross & Gordon-Gray
 Acacia buchananii Harms
 Acacia burkei Benth.
 Acacia caffra (Thunb.) Willd.
 Acacia chariessa Milne-Redh.
 Acacia davyi N.E. Br.
 Acacia eriocarpa Brenan
 Acacia erioloba E. Mey. (Acacia giraffae sensu auct.)
 Acacia erubescens Welw. ex Oliv.
 Acacia exuvialis Verdoorn
 Acacia fleckii Schinz
 Acacia galpinii Burtt Davy
 Acacia gerrardii Benth.
 Acacia goetzei Harms subsp. microphylla Brenan
 Acacia grandicornuta Gerstn.
 Acacia haematoxylon Willd.
 Acacia hebeclada DC.
 Acacia hebeclada DC. subsp. tristis A. Schreib.
 Acacia hereroensis Engl.
 Acacia hockii De Wild.

 Acacia karroo Hayne
 Acacia kirkii Oliv.
 Acacia kraussiana Meisn. ex Benth.
 Acacia luederitzii Engl.
 Acacia mellifera (Vahl) Benth.
 Acacia mellifera (Vahl) Benth. subsp. detinens (Burch.) Brenan
 Acacia montis-usti Merxm. & A. Schreib.
 Acacia nebrownii Burtt Davy
 Acacia nigrescens Oliv. (Acacia passargei Harms)
 Acacia nilotica (L.) Willd. ex Del. subsp. kraussiana (Benth.) Brenan
 Acacia pallens (Benth.) Rolfe
 Acacia pentagona (Schum. & Thonn.) Hook.f.
 Acacia permixta Burtt Davy
 Acacia pilispina Pic.Serm.
 Acacia polyacantha Willd. subsp. campylacantha (Hochst. ex A. Rich.) Brenan
 Acacia reficiens Wawra
 Acacia rehmanniana Schinz
 Acacia robusta Burch. subsp. clavigera (E. Mey.) Brenan
 Acacia robusta Burch.
 Acacia robynsiana Merxm. & A. Schreib.
 Acacia schweinfurthii Brenan & Exell
 Acacia senegal (L.) Willd.
 Acacia seyal Delile
 Acacia sieberiana var. woodii (Burtt Davy) Keay & Brenan
 Acacia stuhlmannii Traub.
 Acacia swazica Burtt Davy
 Acacia tenuispina Verdoorn
 Acacia torrei Brenan
 Acacia tortilis (Forsk.) Hayne subsp. heteracantha (Burch.) Brenan
 Acacia tortilis (Forsk.) Hayne subsp. spirocarpa (Hochst. ex A. Rich.) Brenan
 Acacia welwitschii Oliv. subsp. delagoensis (Harms) J.H. Ross & Brenan

 Acacia xanthophloea Benth.
 Dichrostachys cinerea (L.) Wight & Arn. subsp. africana Brenan & Brummitt
 Dichrostachys cinerea (L.) Wight & Arn. subsp. nyassana (Taub.) Brenan
 Amblygonocarpus andongensis (Welw. ex Oliv.) Exell & Torre
 Newtonia buchananii (Baker) G.C.C.Gilbert & Boutiqu
 Newtonia hildebrandtii (Vatke) Torre
 Xylia mendoncae Torre
 Xylia torreana Brenan
 Elephantorrhiza burkei Benth.
 Elephantorrhiza elephantina (Burch.) Skeels
 Elephantorrhiza goetzei (Harms) Harms
 Elephantorrhiza praeterissima J.H. Ross
 Elephantorrhiza rangei Harms
 Elephantorrhiza schinziana Dinter
 Elephantorrhiza suffruticosa Schinz
 Entada abyssinica A.Rich.
 Entada arenaria Schinz
 Entada gigas (L.) Fawc. & Rendle
 Entada rheedii Spreng. (Entada pursaetha)
 Entada wahlbergii Harv.
 Entadopsis abyssinica (Steud. ex A. Rich.) Gilbert & Boutique
 Adenopodia spicata (E. Mey.) Presl. (Entada spicata)
 Leucaena leucocephala (Lam.) de Wit
 Pentaclethra macrophylla Benth.
 Cathormion altissimum Hutch.
 Mimosa pigra L.
 Parkia filicoidea Oliv
 Pseudoprosopis fischeri (Taub.) Harms

Caesalpiniaceae

 Erythrophleum africanum (Welw. ex Benth.) Harms
 Erythrophleum lasianthum Corbishley
 Erythrophleum suaveolens (Guill. & Perr.) Brenan (Erythrophleum guineense G.Don)
 Burkea africana Hook.
 Colophospermum mopane (Kirk ex Benth.) Kirk ex J. Léonard
 Guibourtia coleosperma (Benth.) J. Léonard
 Guibourtia conjugata (Bolle) J. Léonard
 Hymenaea verrucosa Gaertn.
 Brachystegia allenii Burtt Davy & Hutch.
 Brachystegia bakeriana Burtt Davy & Hutch.
 Brachystegia boehmii Taub.
 Brachystegia bussei Harms
 Brachystegia floribunda Benth.
 Brachystegia glaberrima R.E.Fr.
 Brachystegia gossweileri Burtt Davy & Hutch.
 Brachystegia longifolia Benth.
 Brachystegia manga De Wild.
 Brachystegia microphylla Harms
 Brachystegia puberula Burtt Davy & Hutch.
 Brachystegia russelliae I.M.Johnst.
 Brachystegia spiciformis Benth.
 Brachystegia stipulata De Wild.
 Brachystegia tamarindoides Benth. (Brachystegia glaucescens Burtt Davy & Hutch.)
 Brachystegia taxifolia Harms
 Brachystegia utilis Burtt Davy & Hutch.
 Brachystegia wangermeeana De Wild.
 Schotia afra (L.) Thunb. (Schotia speciosa, Schotia tamarindifolia)
 Schotia afra (L.) Thunb. var. angustifolia (E. Mey.) Harv.
 Schotia brachypetala Sond. (Schotia rogersii, Schotia semireducta)
 Schotia capitata Bolle (Schotia transvaalensis)
 Schotia latifolia Jacq. (Schotia diversifolia, Schotia cuneifolia)
 Umtiza listeriana Sim
 Baikiaea plurijuga Harms
 Tamarindus indica L.
 Afzelia quanzensis Welw.
 Julbernardia globiflora (Benth.) Troupin
 Julbernardia paniculata (Benth.) Troupin
 Adenolobus garipensis (E. Mey.) Torre & Hillc.
 Adenolobus pechuelii (Kuntze) Torre & Hillc.
 Bauhinia bowkeri Harv.
 Bauhinia galpinii N.E. Br.
 Bauhinia mendoncae Torre & Hillc.
 Bauhinia natalensis Oliv.
 Bauhinia petersiana Bolle subsp. macrantha (Oliv.) Brummitt & J.H. Ross (Bauhinia petersiana subsp. serpae (Ficalho & Hiern) Brummitt & J.H. Ross)
 Bauhinia thonningii Schum.
 Bauhinia tomentosa L.
 Bauhinia urbaniana Schinz
 Tylosema esculentum (Burch.) A.Schreib. (Bauhinia bainesii Schinz), (Bauhinia esculenta Burch.)
 Tylosema fassoglensis (Schweinf.) Torre & Hillc. (Bauhinia fassoglensis Schweinf.)
 Piliostigma thonningii (Schumach.) Milne-Redh.
 Dialium angolense Oliv.
 Dialium englerianum Henriq.
 Dialium schlechteri Harms
 Cassia abbreviata Oliv. subsp. beareana (Holmes) Brenan
 Cassia afrofistula Brenan
 Cassia tettensis Bolle
 Senna obtusifolia (L.) H.S.Irwin & Barneby
 Senna occidentalis (L.) Link
 Senna petersiana (Bolle) Lock (Cassia petersiana Bolle)
 Senna singueana (Delile) Lock
 Pterolobium stellatum (Forssk.) Brenan (Pterolobium exosum Bak.f.)
 Caesalpinia angolensis (Oliv.) Herend. & Zarucchi (Mezoneuron angolense Oliv.)
 Caesalpinia bonduc (L.) Roxb. & Bonduc
 Caesalpinia gilliesii (Hook.) D.Dietr.
 Caesalpinia merxmuelleriana A.Schreib.
 Caesalpinia pearsoni L.Bolus
 Caesalpinia rostrata N.E.Br.
 Caesalpinia rubra (Engl.) Brenan
 Parkinsonia aculeata L.
 Parkinsonia africana Sond.
 Bussea massaiensis (Taub.) Harms
 Bussea xylocarpa (Sprague) Sprague & Craib
 Peltophorum africanum Sond.
 Cordyla africana Lour.
 Bobgunnia madagascariensis (Desv.) J.H.Kirkbr. & Wiersema (Swartzia madagascariensis Desv.)
 Haematoxylum dinteri (Harms) Harms
 Isoberlinia angolensis var. niembaensis (De Wild.) Brenan
 Berlinia orientalis Brenan
 Copaifera baumiana Harms
 Cryptosepalum exfoliatum De Wild.
 Cryptosepalum exfoliatum subsp. pseudotaxus (Baker f.) P.A.Duvign. & Brenan
 Cryptosepalum maraviense Oliv.
 Aphanocalyx richardsiae (J.Leonard) Wieringa (Monopetalanthus richardsiae J.Leonard)
 Aphanocalyx trapnellii (J.Leonard) Wieringa (Monopetalanthus trapnellii J.Leonard)
 Tessmannia burttii Harms

Fabaceae

 Abrus precatorius L.
 Abrus schimperi Baker
 Adenocarpus mannii (Hook.f.) Hook.f.
 Pericopsis angolensis (Baker) Meeuwen (Afrormosia angolensis (Baker) De Wild.)
 Sophora inhambanensis Klotzsch
 Calpurnia aurea (Ait.) Benth.
 Calpurnia aurea (Ait.) Benth. subsp. sylvatica (Burch.) Brummitt
 Calpurnia glabrata Brummitt
 Calpurnia robinioides (DC.) E. Mey.
 Calpurnia sericea Harv. (Calpurnia intrusa)
 Virgilia divaricata Adamson
 Virgilia oroboides (Berg.) Salter
 Bolusanthus speciosus (H. Bol.) Harms
 Baphia angolensis Baker
 Baphia bequaertii De Wild.
 Baphia capparidifolia subsp. bangweolensis (R.E.Fr.) Brummitt
 Baphia massaiensis Taub. subsp. obovata (Schinz.) Brummitt
 Baphia racemosa (Hochst.) Bak.
 Crotalaria capensis Jacq.
 Podalyria calyptrata Willd.
 Lebeckia linearifolia E.Mey.
 Lebeckia multiflora E.Mey.
 Lebeckia obovata Schinz
 Lebeckia spinescens Harv.
 Wiborgia sericea Thunb.
 Wiborgia mucronata (L.f.) Druce
 Aspalathus bidouwensis R.Dahlgren
 Indigofera adenocarpa E.Mey.
 Indigofera arrecta A.Rich.
 Indigofera atriceps Hook.f.
 Indigofera garckeana Vatke
 Indigofera glaucifolia Cronquist
 Indigofera homblei Baker f. & Martin
 Indigofera jucunda Schrire (Indigofera frutescens L.f.) (Indigofera cylindrica DC.)
 Indigofera lupatana Baker f.
 Indigofera lyallii Bak.
 Indigofera macrocalyx Guill. & Perr.
 Indigofera melanadenia Harv.
 Indigofera natalensis H. Bol.
 Indigofera nudicaulis E.Mey.
 Indigofera podocarpa Baker f. & Martin
 Indigofera ormocarpoides Baker
 Indigofera rautanenii Baker f.
 Indigofera rhynchocarpa Baker
 Indigofera schimperi Jaub. & Spach
 Indigofera subcorymbosa Baker
 Indigofera sutherlandoides Baker
 Indigofera swaziensis Bolus
 Psoralea aphylla L.
 Psoralea pinnata L.
 Otholobium foliosum (Oliv.) C.H.Stirt. (Psoralea foliosa Oliv.)
 Mundulea sericea (Willd.) A. Chev.
 Tephrosia aequilata Baker
 Tephrosia oxygona Baker
 Tephrosia pondoensis (Codd) Schrire (Mundulea pondoensis)
 Tephrosia praecana Brummitt
 Tephrosia vogelii Hook.f.
 Millettia grandis (E. Mey.) Skeels
 Millettia mossambicensis J.B.Gillett
 Millettia stuhlmannii Taub.
 Millettia sutherlandii Harv. (Philenoptera sutherlandii (Harv.) Schrire)
 Millettia usaramensis Taub.
 Craibia brevicaudata (Vatke) Dunn
 Craibia zimmermannii (Harms) Dunn
 Sesbania cinerascens Welw. ex Bak. (Sesbania kapangensis Cronquist)
 Sesbania coerulescens Harms
 Sesbania goetzei Harms
 Sesbania macrantha E.Phillips & Hutch.
 Sesbania microphylla E.Phillips & Hutch.
 Sesbania sesban (L.) Merr.
 Sesbania tetraptera subsp. rogersii (E.Phillips & Hutch.) G.P.Lewis (Sesbania rogersii E.Phillips & Hutch.)
 Ormocarpum kirkii S. Moore
 Ormocarpum trichocarpum (Taub.) Engl.
 Solulus bibracteatus (Steud. ex A. Rich.) Kuntze (Ormocarpum bibracteatum (Steud. ex A. Rich.) Baker)
 Aeschynomene megalophylla Harms
 Aeschynomene nodulosa (Bak.) Bak.f.
 Kotschya aeschynomenoides (Baker) Dewit & P.A.Duvign.
 Kotschya africana Endl.
 Kotschya parvifolia (Burtt Davy) Verd.
 Kotschya recurvifolia (Taub.) F.White
 Kotschya strobilantha (Baker) Dewit & P.A.Duvign.
 Kotschya thymodora (Bak.f.) Wild
 Leptoderris goetzei (Harms) Dunn
 Leptoderris nobilis (Baker) Dunn
 Dalbergia arbutifolia Baker
 Dalbergia armata E. Mey.
 Dalbergia boehmii Taub.
 Dalbergia fischeri Taub.
 Dalbergia martinii F.White
 Dalbergia melanoxylon Guill. & Perr.
 Dalbergia multijuga E. Mey.
 Dalbergia nitidula Welw ex Bak.
 Dalbergia obovata E. Mey.
 Dalbergiella nyassae Baker f.
 Philenoptera bussei (Harms) Schrire
 Philenoptera nelsii (Schinz) Schrire
 Philenoptera violacea (Klotzsch) Schrire (Lonchocarpus capassa Rolfe p.p.)
 Pterocarpus angolensis DC.
 Pterocarpus antunesii (Taub.) Harms
 Pterocarpus brenanii Barbosa & Torre
 Pterocarpus lucens Guill. & Perr. subsp. antunesii (Taub.) Rojo
 Pterocarpus rotundifolius (Sond.) Druce (Pterocarpus sericeus Benth.)
 Pterocarpus tinctorius Welw. (Pterocarpus chrysothrix Taub.)
 Lonchocarpus bussei Harms (Lonchocarpus menyhartii Schinz)
 Lonchocarpus eriocalyx Harms
 Lonchocarpus katangensis De Wild.
 Lonchocarpus nelsii (Schinz) Heering & Grimme
 Lonchocarpus sutherlandii (Harv.) Dunn (Millettia sutherlandii Harv.)
 Mucuna gigantea (Willd.) DC.
 Mucuna poggei Taub.
 Mucuna pruriens (L.) DC.
 Mucuna stans Baker
 Xeroderris stuhlmannii (Taub.) Mendonça & E.P. Sousa (Ostryoderris stuhlmannii (Taub.) Dunn ex Harms)
 Xanthocercis zambesiaca (Bak.) Dumaz-le-Grand (Pseudocadia zambesiaca (Baker) Harms)
 Erythrina abyssinica Lam.
 Erythrina baumii Harms
 Erythrina caffra Thunb.
 Erythrina decora Harms
 Erythrina excelsa Baker
 Erythrina humeana Spreng.
 Erythrina latissima E. Mey.
 Erythrina livingstoniana Baker
 Erythrina lysistemon Hutch.
 Erythrina mendesii Torre
 Erythrina zeyheri Harv. - geoxyle
 Otoptera burchellii DC.
 Rhynchosia caribaea (Jacq.) DC.
 Rhynchosia clivorum S. Moore
 Rhynchosia hirta (Andrews) Meikle & Verdc. (Rhynchosia albiflora (Sims) Alston)
 Rhynchosia procurrens subsp. floribunda (Baker) Verdc. (Rhynchosia floribunda Baker)
 Dipogon lignosus (L.) Verdc.

Geraniaceae
 Sarcocaulon marlothii Engl.
 Pelargonium otaviense R. Knuth
 Monsonia marlothii (Engl.) F.Albers

Linaceae
 Hugonia busseana Engl.
 Hugonia orientalis Engl.

Ixonanthaceae
 Phyllocosmus lemaireanus (De Wild. & T.Durand) T.Durand & H.Durand (Ochthocosmus lemaireanus De Wild. & T.Durand)

Erythroxylaceae
 Nectaropetalum capense (H. Bol.) Stapf & Boodle (Peglera capensis, Erythroxylum capense)
 Nectaropetalum zuluense (Schonl.) Corbishley
 Erythroxylum delagoense Schinz.
 Erythroxylum emarginatum Thonn.
 Erythroxylum pictum E. Mey. ex Sond.
 Erythroxylum zambesiacum N.K.B. Robson

Zygophyllaceae
 Zygophyllum prismatocarpum E. Mey. ex Sond.
 Neoluederitzia sericocarpa Schinz
 Sisyndite spartea E.Mey. ex Sond.

Balanitaceae
 Balanites aegyptiaca (L.) Delile
 Balanites angolensis (Welw.) Mildbr. & Schltr.
 Balanites maughamii Sprague
 Balanites pedicellaris Mildbr. & Schlecht.

Rutaceae

 Agathosma betulina (P.J.Bergius) Pillans
 Agathosma hispida (Thunb.) Bartl. & H.L.Wendl. (Hartogia schinoides C.A.Sm.)
 Ptaeroxylon obliquum (Thunb.) Radlk. (Ptaeroxylon utile Eckl. & Zeyh.)
 Zanthoxylum capense (Thunb.) Harv. (Fagara capensis Thunb., Fagara magalismontana Engl.)
 Zanthoxylum chalybeum Engl.
 Zanthoxylum davyi (Verdoorn) Waterm. (Fagara davyi Verd.)
 Zanthoxylum gilletii (De Wild.) P.G.Waterman (Fagara macrophylla (Oliv.) Engl.)
 Zanthoxylum holtzianum (Engl.) P.G. Waterman (Fagara holtziana Engl.)
 Zanthoxylum humile (E.A. Bruce) Waterm.
 Zanthoxylum leprieurii Guill. & Perr. (Fagara leprieurii (Guill. & Perr.) Engl.)
 Zanthoxylum ovatifoliolatum (Engl.) Finkelstein
 Zanthoxylum thorncroftii Waterm.
 Fagara chalybea (Engl.) Engl.
 Fagara schlechteri Engl.
 Fagara trijuga Dunkley
 Fagaropsis angolensis (Engl.) H.M.Gardner
 Calodendrum capense (L.f.) Thunb.
 Vepris bachmannii (Engl.) Mziray (Oricia bachmannii (Engl.) Verd.)
 Vepris carringtoniana Mendonça
 Vepris lanceolata (Lam.) G. Don (Vepris undulata Verdoorn & C.A. Smith)
 Vepris myrei (Exell & Mendonça) Mziray (Teclea myrei Exell & Mendonça)
 Vepris reflexa Verdoorn
 Vepris trichocarpa (Engl.) Mziray (Teclea trichocarpa (Engl.) Engl.)
 Vepris zambesiaca S. Moore
 Toddalia asiatica (L.) Lam.
 Toddalia glomerata F.Hoffm. (Teclea glomerata Verd.)
 Toddaliopsis bremekampii Verdoorn
 Teclea fischeri (Engl.) Engl.
 Teclea gerrardii Verdoorn
 Teclea natalensis (Sond.) Engl. (Toddalia natalensis Sond.)
 Teclea nobilis Del.
 Teclea pilosa (Engl.) Verdoorn
 Clausena anisata (Willd.) Hook. f. ex Benth. (Clausena inaequalis (DC.) Benth.)
 Citropsis daweana Swingle & Kellerm.

Irvingiaceae
 Klainedoxa gabonensis Pierre

Simaroubaceae
 Harrisonia abyssinica Oliv.
 Kirkia acuminata Oliv.
 Kirkia dewinteri Merxm. & Heine
 Kirkia wilmsii Engl.

Burseraceae

 Dacryodes edulis (G.Don) H.J.Lam
 Commiphora africana (A. Rich) Engl. (Commiphora pilosa, Commiphora sambesiaca)
 Commiphora anacardiifolia Dinter & Engl.
 Commiphora angolensis Engl.
 Commiphora caerulea Burtt
 Commiphora capensis (Sond.) Engl.
 Commiphora cervifolia Van der Walt
 Commiphora crenato-serrata Engl.
 Commiphora dinteri Engl.
 Commiphora discolor Mendes
 Commiphora edulis (Klotzsch) Engl.
 Commiphora giessii Van der Walt
 Commiphora glandulosa Schinz (Commiphora pyracanthoides Engl. subsp. glandulosa (Schinz) Wild)
 Commiphora glaucescens Engl.
 Commiphora gracilifrondosa Dinter ex J.J.A. v.d. Walt
 Commiphora harveyi (Engl.) Engl.
 Commiphora karibensis Wild
 Commiphora kraeuseliana Heine
 Commiphora marlothii Engl.
 Commiphora merkeri Engl.
 Commiphora mollis (Oliv.) Engl.
 Commiphora mossambicensis (Oliv.) Engl. (Commiphora fischeri Engl.)
 Commiphora multijuga (Hiern) K. Schum.
 Commiphora namaensis Schinz
 Commiphora neglecta Verdoorn
 Commiphora oblanceolata Schinz
 Commiphora pyracanthoides Engl.
 Commiphora saxicola Engl.
 Commiphora schimperi (O. Berg) Engl.
 Commiphora schlechteri Engl.
 Commiphora serrata Engl.
 Commiphora tenuipetiolata Engl.
 Commiphora ugogensis Engl.
 Commiphora virgata Engl.
 Commiphora wildii Merxm.
 Commiphora woodii Engl.
 Commiphora zanzibarica (Baill.) Engl.

Meliaceae
 Khaya nyasica Stapf ex Baker f. (Khaya anthotheca (Welw.) C. DC.)
 Entandrophragma caudatum (Sprague) Sprague
 Entandrophragma spicatum (C.DC.) Sprague
 Lovoa swynnertonii Baker f.
 Xylocarpus granatum J.Koenig
 Nymania capensis (Thunb.) Lindb.
 Turraea fischeri Gürke
 Turraea floribunda Hochst.
 Turraea nilotica Kotschy & Peyr.
 Turraea obtusifolia Hochst.
 Turraea wakefieldii Oliv.
 Turraea zambesica Styles & White
 Turraeanthus africana (Welw. ex C.DC.) Pellegr.
 Ekebergia benguelensis Welw. ex C.DC. (Ekebergia arborea Baker f.)
 Ekebergia capensis Sparrm. (Ekebergia ruepelliana, Ekebergia meyeri, Ekebergia buchananii)
 Ekebergia pterophylla (C. DC.) Hofmeyr
 Trichilia capitata Klotzsch
 Trichilia dregeana Sond.
 Trichilia emetica Vahl
 Trichilia martiana C.DC. (Trichilia chirindensis Swynn. & Baker f.)
 Pseudobersama mossambicensis (Sim) Verdc. (Bersama mossambicensis)

Malpighiaceae
 Triaspis glaucophylla Engl.
 Sphedamnocarpus galphimiifolius (A. Juss.) Szyszyl.
 Sphedamnocarpus pruriens (A. Juss.) Szyszyl.
 Sphedamnocarpus transvaalicus (Kuntze) Burtt Davy
 Acridocarpus natalitius Adr. & Juss.

Polygalaceae
 Polygala lancifolia A. St.-Hil. & Moq. (Polygala virgata Thunb.)
 Polygala myrtifolia L.
 Securidaca longipedunculata Fresen.
 Carpolobia goetzei Gürke (Carpolobia conradsiana Engl.)

Dichapetalaceae
 Tapura fischeri Engl.

Phyllanthaceae
 Pseudophyllanthus ovalis (E.Mey. ex Sond.) Voronts. & Petra Hoffm. (Andrachne ovalis (Sond.) Muell. Arg.)
 Lachnostylis bilocularis R.A. Dyer
 Lachnostylis hirta (L.f.) Muell. Arg.
 Heywoodia lucens Sim
 Pseudolachnostylis maprouneifolia Pax
 Flueggea verrucosa (Thunb.) G.L.Webster (Phyllanthus verrucosus)
 Flueggea virosa (Roxb. ex Willd.) Royle (Securinega virosa (Roxb. ex Willd.) Baill.)
 Margaritaria discoidea (Baill.) Webster (Phyllanthus discoideus (Baill.) Muell. Arg.)
 Margaritaria discoidea (Baill.) Webster var. fagifolia  (Pax) A. Radcliffe-Smith (Phyllanthus fagifolia)
 Margaritaria discoidea (Baill.) Webster var. nitida (Pax) A. Radcliffe-Smith (Flueggea nitida)
 Phyllanthus cedrelifolius Verdc.
 Phyllanthus engleri Pax
 Phyllanthus inflatus Hutch.
 Phyllanthus macranthus Pax
 Phyllanthus ovalifolius Forssk. (Phyllanthus guineensis Pax)
 Phyllanthus pinnatus (Wight) G.L.Webster (Phyllanthus kirkianus Müll.Arg.)
 Phyllanthus reticulatus Poir.
 Hymenocardia acida Tul.
 Hymenocardia ulmoides Oliv.
 Antidesma membranaceum Müll.Arg.
 Antidesma rufescens Tul.
 Antidesma venosum E. Mey. ex Tul.
 Uapaca kirkiana Müll.Arg.
 Uapaca lissopyrena Radcl.-Sm.
 Uapaca nitida Müll.Arg.
 Uapaca sansibarica Pax
 Cleistanthus polystachyus subsp. milleri (Dunkley) Radcl.-Sm. (Cleistanthus apetalus S.Moore)
 Cleistanthus schlechteri (Pax) Hutch.
 Bridelia atroviridis Müll.Arg.
 Bridelia cathartica Bertol.f.
 Bridelia cathartica Bertol.f. subsp. melanthesoides (Klotzsch ex Baill.) J.Léonard
 Bridelia micrantha (Hochst.) Baill.
 Bridelia mollis Hutch.
 Bridelia tenuifolia Muell. Arg.

Putranjivaceae
 Drypetes arguta (Muell. Arg.) Hutch.
 Drypetes gerrardii Hutch. (Drypetes battiscombei Hutch.)
 Drypetes mossambicensis Hutch.
 Drypetes natalensis (Harv.) Hutch.
 Drypetes reticulata Pax

Picrodendraceae
 Hyaenanche globosa (Gaertn.) Lamb. & Vahl
 Androstachys johnsonii Prain

Euphorbiaceae

 Croton gratissimus Burch. (Croton zambesicus Müll.Arg.)
 Croton gratissimus Burch. var. subgratissimus (Prain) Burtt Davy
 Croton leuconeurus Pax
 Croton longipedicellatus J.Léonard
 Croton madadensis S. Moore
 Croton megalobotrys Muell. Arg.
 Croton megalocarpus Hutch.
 Croton menyhartii Pax
 Croton pseudopulchellus Pax
 Croton scheffleri Pax
 Croton steenkampianus Gerstner
 Croton sylvaticus Hochst.
 Cavacoa aurea (Cavaco) J. Léonard
 Erythrococca berberidea Prain (Micrococca berberidea (Prain) E.Phillips)
 Erythrococca menyhartii (Pax) Prain
 Erythrococca polyandra (Pax & K.Hoffm.) Prain
 Micrococca capensis (Baill.) Prain
 Tannodia swynnertonii (S.Moore) Prain
 Mallotus oppositifolius (Geiseler) Müll.Arg.
 Argomuellera macrophylla Pax
 Alchornea hirtella f. glabrata (Müll.Arg.) Pax & K.Hoffm.
 Alchornea laxiflora (Benth.) Pax & K. Hoffm.
 Necepsia castaneifolia (Baill.) Bouchat & J.Léonard (Neopalissya castaneifolia (Baill.) Pax)
 Neoboutonia melleri (Müll.Arg.) Prain
 Macaranga capensis (Baill.) Benth. ex Sim (Macaranga bachmannii)
 Macaranga mellifera Prain
 Acalypha chirindica S.Moore
 Acalypha fruticosa Forssk.
 Acalypha glabrata Thunb.
 Acalypha sonderiana Muell. Arg.
 Jatropha spicata Pax (Jatropha messinica E.A. Bruce)
 Cephalocroton mollis Klotzsch
 Clutia abyssinica Jaub. & Spach (Clutia glabrescens)
 Clutia pulchella L.
 Schinziophyton rautanenii (Schinz) Radcl.-Sm. (Ricinodendron rautanenii Schinz)
 Suregada africana (Sond.) Müll.Arg.
 Suregada procera (Prain) Croizat
 Suregada zanzibariensis Baill.
 Spirostachys africana Sond.
 Excoecaria bussei (Pax) Pax
 Excoecaria madagascariensis (Baill.) Müll.Arg.
 Excoecaria simii (Kuntze) Pax
 Plesiatropha carpinifolia (Pax) Breteler (Mildbraedia carpinifolia (Pax) Hutch.)
 Shirakiopsis elliptica (Hochst.) Esser (Sapium ellipticum (Hochst.) Pax)
 Sclerocroton integerrimus Hochst. (Sapium integerrimum (Hochst.) J. Léonard)
 Maprounea africana Muell. Arg.
 Euphorbia angularis Klotzsch
 Euphorbia avasmontana Dinter
 Euphorbia confinalis R.A. Dyer
 Euphorbia cooperi N.E. Br. ex Berger
 Euphorbia curvirama R.A. Dyer
 Euphorbia damarana Leach
 Euphorbia decliviticola L. C. Leach
 Euphorbia eduardoi Leach
 Euphorbia espinosa Pax
 Euphorbia evansii Pax
 Euphorbia excelsa A.C.White, R.A.Dyer & B.Sloane
 Euphorbia fortissima L.C.Leach
 Euphorbia grandialata R.A. Dyer
 Euphorbia grandicornis Goeb. ex N.E. Br.
 Euphorbia grandidens Haw.
 Euphorbia gregaria Marloth
 Euphorbia griseola Pax
 Euphorbia guerichiana Pax
 Euphorbia gummifera Boiss.
 Euphorbia halipedicola L.C.Leach
 Euphorbia ingens E. Mey. ex Boiss.
 Euphorbia keithii R.A. Dyer
 Euphorbia knobelii Letty
 Euphorbia lividiflora L.C.Leach
 Euphorbia lugardae (N.E.Br.) Bruyns (Monadenium lugardae N.E.Br.)
 Euphorbia lydenburgensis Schweickerdt & Letty
 Euphorbia malevola L.C. Leach
 Euphorbia matabelensis Pax
 Euphorbia monteiroi Hook.
 Euphorbia perangusta R.A.Dyer
 Euphorbia pseudocactus A.Berger
 Euphorbia rowlandii R.A. Dyer
 Euphorbia sekukuniensis R.A. Dyer
 Euphorbia tetragona Haw.
 Euphorbia tirucalli L.
 Euphorbia triangularis Desf.
 Euphorbia venenata Marloth
 Euphorbia virosa Willd.
 Euphorbia waterbergensis R.A. Dyer
 Euphorbia wildii L.C.Leach
 Euphorbia zoutpansbergensis R.A. Dyer
 Synadenium cupulare (Boiss.) L.C. Wheeler

Buxaceae
 Buxus macowanii Oliv.
 Buxus natalensis (Oliv.) Hutch.

Anacardiaceae

 Sclerocarya birrea (A. Rich.) Hochst. subsp. caffra (Sond.) Kokwaro (Sclerocarya caffra Sond.)
 Harpephyllum caffrum Bernh.
 Lannea antiscorbutica (Hiern) Engl.
 Lannea discolor (Sond.) Engl.
 Lannea humilis (Oliv.) Engl.
 Lannea schimperi (Hochst. ex A.Rich.) Engl.
 Lannea schweinfurthii (Engl.) Engl. var. stuhlmannii (Engl.) Kokwaro
 Lannea schweinfurthii (Engl.) Engl. var. tomentosa (Dunkley) Kokwaro
 Sorindeia juglandifolia (A.Rich.) Planchon ex Oliver
 Trichoscypha ulugurensis Mildbr.
 Protorhus longifolia (Bernh.) Engl.
 Loxostylis alata Spreng.f. ex Reichb.
 Laurophyllus capensis Thunb.
 Smodingium argutum E. Mey. ex Sond.
 Heeria argentea (Thunb.) Meisn.
 Ozoroa argyrochrysea (Engl. & Gilg) R.Fern. & A.Fern.
 Ozoroa bredoi R.Fern. & A.Fern.
 Ozoroa concolor (Presl ex Sond.) De Winter
 Ozoroa crassinervia (Engl.) R. & A. Fernandes
 Ozoroa dispar R. & A. Fernandes
 Ozoroa engleri R. & A. Fernandes
 Ozoroa hereroensis (Schinz) R. Fern. & A. Fern.
 Ozoroa homblei (De Wild.) R.Fern. & A.Fern.
 Ozoroa insignis Del. subsp. reticulata (Bak.f.) J.B. Gillett (Ozoroa reticulata (Baker f.) R.Fern. & A.Fern.)
 Ozoroa longipes (Engl. & Gilg) R. & A. Fernandes
 Ozoroa longipetiolata R. Fern. & A. Fern.
 Ozoroa mucronata (Bernh. ex Krauss) R. & A. Fernandes
 Ozoroa namaensis (Schinz & Dinter) R. Fernandes
 Ozoroa namaquensis (Sprague) I. von Teichman & A.E. van Wyk
 Ozoroa nitida (Engl. & Brehmer) R. Fern. & A. Fern.
 Ozoroa obovata (Oliv.) R. & A. Fernandes
 Ozoroa okavangensis R.Fern. & A.Fern.
 Ozoroa paniculosa (Sond.) R. & A. Fernandes
 Ozoroa schinzii (Engl.) R. Fern. & A. Fern.
 Ozoroa sphaerocarpa R. & A. Fernandes
 Rhus angustifolia L.
 Rhus batophylla Codd
 Rhus burchellii Sond. ex Engl.
 Rhus carnosula Schönl
 Rhus chirindensis Bak.f.
 Rhus ciliata Licht. ex Schultes
 Rhus crenata Thunb.
 Rhus dentata Thunb.
 Rhus dura Schönl.
 Rhus engleri Britt.
 Rhus erosa Thunb.
 Rhus fastigiata Eckl. & Zeyh.
 Rhus fraseri Schönland
 Rhus gerrardii Schönland (Rhus montana var. gerrardii R. Fern.)
 Rhus glauca Thunb.
 Rhus gueinzii Sond.
 Rhus incisa L.f.
 Rhus krebsiana Presl ex Engl.
 Rhus laevigata L.
 Rhus longipes Engl.
 Rhus longispina Eckl. & Zeyh.
 Rhus lucens Hutch.
 Rhus lucida L.
 Rhus magalismontana Sond.
 Rhus microcarpa Schönl.
 Rhus montana Diels
 Rhus nebulosa Schönland

 Rhus pendulina Jacq.
 Rhus pentheri Zahlbr.
 Rhus problematodes Merxm. & Roessler
 Rhus pyroides Burch. var. pyroides (Rhus baurii Schönland)
 Rhus quartiniana A. Rich.
 Rhus rehmanniana Engl. (Rhus macowanii Schönland)
 Rhus rigida Mill. (Rhus eckloniana Sond.)
 Rhus tenuinervis Engl.
 Rhus tomentosa L.
 Rhus transvaalensis Engl.
 Rhus tumulicola S. Moore (Rhus culminum A. Fern. & R. Fern.)(Rhus dura Schönland)
 Rhus zeyheri Sond.
 Searsia burchellii (Sond. ex Engl.) Moffett (Rhus undulata var. burchellii Schönland)
 Searsia lancea (L.f.) F.A.Barkley (Rhus lancea L.f.)
 Searsia leptodictya (Diels) T.S.Yi, A.J.Mill. & J.Wen (Rhus leptodictya Diels)
 Searsia marlothii (Engl.) Moffett (Rhus marlothii Engl.)
 Searsia natalensis (Bernh. ex C.Krauss) F.A.Barkley (Rhus natalensis Bernh. ex C.Krauss)
 Searsia populifolia (E.Mey. ex Sond.) Moffett (Rhus populifolia E.Mey. ex Sond.)
 Searsia pyroides (Burch.) Moffett (Rhus pyroides Burch.)
 Searsia quartiniana (A.Rich.) A.J.Mill. (Rhus quartiniana A.Rich.)
 Searsia tenuinervis (Engl.) Moffett (Rhus tenuinervis Engl.)
 Searsia undulata (Jacq.) T.S.Yi, A.J.Mill. & J.Wen (Rhus undulata Jacq.)
 Searsia volkii (Suess.) Moffett (Rhus volkii Suess.)

Aquifoliaceae
 Ilex mitis (L.) Radlk.

Celastraceae

 Brexia madagascariensis (Lam.) Thouars ex Ker Gawl.
 Gymnosporia arenicola Jordaan
 Gymnosporia buxifolia (L.) Szyszyl.
 Maytenus abbottii Van Wyk
 Maytenus acuminata (L.f.) Loes. var. acuminata
 Maytenus bachmannii (Loes.) Marais
 Maytenus chasei N. Robson
 Maytenus cordata Loes.
 Maytenus lucida Loes.
 Maytenus nemorosa (Eckl. & Zeyh.) Marais
 Maytenus oleoides (Lam.) Loes.
 Maytenus oxycarpa N. Robson
 Maytenus peduncularis (Sond.) Loes.
 Maytenus procumbens (L.f.) Loes.
 Maytenus pubescens N. Robson
 Maytenus tenuispina (Sond.) Marais
 Maytenus undata (Thunb.) Blakelock (Celastrus huillensis Welw. ex Oliv.)
 Gymnosporia gariepensis Jordaan
 Gymnosporia harveyana Loes. (Maytenus mossambicensis (Klotzsch) Blakelock)
 Gymnosporia heterophylla (Eckl. & Zeyh.) Loes. (Maytenus heterophylla (Eckl. & Zeyh.) N.K.B. Robson)
 Gymnosporia linearis (L.f.) Loes. (Maytenus linearis (L.f.) Marais)
 Gymnosporia maranguensis (Loes.) Loes.
 Gymnosporia polyacanthus Szyszył. (Maytenus polyacantha (Sond.) Marais)
 Gymnosporia putterlickioides Loes. (Maytenus putterlickioides (Loes.) Exell & Mendonça)
 Gymnosporia rubra (Harv.) Loes. (Maytenus mossambicensis (Klotzsch) Blakelock var. rubra (Harv.) Blakelock)
 Gymnosporia senegalensis (Lam.) Loes. (Maytenus senegalensis (Lam.) Exell)
 Putterlickia pyracantha (L.) Endl.
 Putterlickia verrucosa (E. Mey. ex Sond.) Szyszyl.
 Catha edulis (Vahl.) Forsk. ex Endl.
 Catha transvaalensis Codd
 Pterocelastrus echinatus N.E. Br.
 Pterocelastrus rostratus (Thunb.) Walp.
 Pterocelastrus tricuspidatus (Lam.) Sond.
 Cassine aethiopica Thunb. (Mystroxylon aethiopicum (Thunb.) Loes.)
 Cassine barbara L
 Cassine burkeana (Sond.) Kuntze
 Cassine crocea (Thunb.) Kuntze
 Cassine eucleiformis (Eckl. & Zeyh.) Kuntze
 Cassine matabelica (Loes.) Steedman
 Cassine maritima (Bolus) L.Bolus
 Cassine papillosa (Hochst.) Kuntze
 Cassine parvifolia Sond.
 Cassine peragua L.
 Cassine peragua subsp. barbata (L.) R.H.Archer (Cassine barbara L.)
 Cassine schinoides (Spreng.) R.H.Archer (Hartogiella schinoides (Spreng.) Codd)
 Cassine schlechteriana Loes.
 Cassine tetragona (L.f.) Loes.
 Cassine transvaalensis (Burtt Davy) Codd ( Elaeodendron transvaalense (Burtt Davy) R.H.Archer)
 Allocassine laurifolia (Harv.) N.K.B. Robson
 Maurocenia frangularia (L.) Mill.
 Pleurostylia africana Loes.
 Pleurostylia capensis (Turcz.) Oliv.
 Loeseneriella africana var. richardiana (Cambess.) R.Wilczek ex N.Hallé
 Hippocratea buchananii Loes.
 Hippocratea crenata (Klotzsch) K. Schum. & Loes.
 Hippocratea longipetiolata Oliv.
 Loeseneriella crenata (Klotzsch) R.Wilczek (Gymnema crenata Klotzsch)
 Prionostemma delagoensis (Loes.) N.Hallé (Hippocratea delagoensis Loes., Pristimera delagoensis (Loes.) R.H.Archer)
 Elachyptera parvifolia (Oliv.) N.Hallé (Hippocratea parvifolia Oliv.)
 Pristimera andongensis var. volkensii (Loes.) N. Hallé & B. Mathew (Hippocratea volkensii Loes.)
 Pristimera longipetiolata (Oliv.) N. Hallé
 Pristimera peglerae (Loes.) R.H.Archer
 Salacia leptoclada Tul.
 Pseudosalacia streyi Codd
 Reissantia buchananii (Loes.) N. Hallé
 Reissantia indica (Willd.) N.Hallé (Hippocratea indica Willd. Pristimera indica (Willd.) A.C.Sm.)
 Reissantia buchananii (Loes.) N. Hallé (Hippocratea buchananii Loes.)
 Reissantia indica (Willd.) N.Hallé (Hippocratea indica Willd.)
 Reissantia parviflora (N.E.Br.) N.Hallé

Icacinaceae

 Cassinopsis ilicifolia (Hochst.) Kuntze
 Cassinopsis tinifolia Harv.
 Apodytes dimidiata E. Mey. ex Arn.
 Pyrenacantha grandiflora Baill.
 Pyrenacantha malvifolia Engl.
 Pyrenacantha scandens Planch. ex Harv.
 Rhaphiostylis beninensis (Hook.f. ex Planch.) Planch. ex Benth. (Apodytes beninensis Hook.f. ex Planch.)

Sapindaceae
 Allophylus abyssinicus (Hochst.) Radlk.
 Allophylus africanus Beauv.
 Allophylus chaunostachys Gilg
 Allophylus chirindensis Baker f.
 Allophylus decipiens (E.Mey.) Radlk.
 Allophylus dregeanus (Sond.) De Winter
 Allophylus melanocarpus (Sond.) Radlk.
 Allophylus natalensis (Sond.) De Winter
 Allophylus rubifolius var. alnifolius (Baker) Friis & Vollesen (Allophylus alnifolius (Baker) Radlk.)
 Atalaya alata (Sim) H. Forbes
 Atalaya capensis R.A. Dyer
 Atalaya natalensis R.A. Dyer
 Deinbollia oblongifolia (E. Mey. ex Arn.) Radlk.
 Deinbollia xanthocarpa (E. Mey.) Radlk.
 Lepisanthes senegalensis (Poir.) Leenh. (Aphania senegalensis (Poir.) Radlk.)
 Pancovia golungensis (Hiern) Exell & Mendonça
 Smelophyllum capense Radlk.
 Glenniea africana (Radlk.) Leenh.
 Lecaniodiscus fraxinifolia Baker
 Haplocoelum foliolosum (Hiern) Bullock
 Haplocoelum gallense (Engl.) Radlk.
 Macphersonia gracilis var. hildebrandtii (O. Hoffm.) Capuron (Macphersonia hildebrandtii O. Hoffm.)
 Pappea capensis Eckl. & Zeyh.
 Stadmannia oppositifolia Poir. subsp. rhodesica Exell
 Aporrhiza paniculata Radlk. (Aporrhiza nitida Gilg ex Milne-Redh.)
 Blighia unijugata Bak.
 Erythrophysa alata (Eckl. & Zeyh.) Hutch.
 Erythrophysa transvaalensis Verdoorn
 Dodonaea viscosa Jacq.
 Dodonaea viscosa subsp. angustifolia (L.f.) J.G.West (Dodonaea angustifolia L.f.)
 Hippobromus pauciflorus (L.f.) Radlk.
 Zanha africana (Radlk.) Exell
 Zanha golungensis Hiern

Melianthaceae
 Bersama abyssinica Fresen.
 Bersama lucens (Hochst.) Szyszyl.
 Bersama stayneri Phill.
 Bersama swinnyi Phill.
 Bersama swynnertonii Baker f.
 Bersama transvaalensis Turrill
 Bersama tysoniana Oliv.

Greyiaceae
 Greyia flanaganii H. Bol.
 Greyia radlkoferi Szyszyl.
 Greyia sutherlandii Hook. & Harv.

Rhamnaceae
 Ziziphus abyssinica Hochst. ex A.Rich.
 Ziziphus jujuba Mill. (Ziziphus mauritiana Lam.)
 Ziziphus mucronata Willd.
 Ziziphus pubescens Oliv.
 Ziziphus rivularis Codd
 Berchemia discolor (Klotzsch) Hemsl.
 Berchemia zeyheri (Sond.) Grubov
 Scutia myrtina (Burm.f.) Kurz
 Rhamnus prinoides L'Herit.
 Rhamnus staddo A.Rich.
 Noltea africana (L.) Reichb.f.
 Colubrina asiatica (L.) Brongn.
 Phylica buxifolia L.
 Phylica oleifolia Vent.
 Phylica paniculata Willd.
 Phylica purpurea Sond.
 Phylica villosa Thunb.
 Lasiodiscus mildbraedii Engl.
 Lasiodiscus pervillei Baill.
 Lasiodiscus usambarensis Engl.
 Helinus integrifolius (Lam.) Kuntze
 Helinus spartioides Schinz Ex Engl.

Vitaceae
 Cyphostemma bainesii (Hook.f.) Desc.
 Cyphostemma currorii (Hook.f.) Desc.
 Cyphostemma juttae (Dinter & Gilg) Desc.
 Cyphostemma uter (Exell & Mendonça) Desc.
 Rhoicissus capensis (Burm. f.) Planch.
 Rhoicissus digitata (L.f.) Gilg & Brandt
 Rhoicissus revoilii Planch.
 Rhoicissus rhomboidea (E. Mey ex Harv.) Planch.
 Rhoicissus tomentosa (Lam.) Wild & Drummond
 Rhoicissus tridentata (L.f.) Wild & Drummond
 Rhoicissus tridentata subsp. cuneifolia (Eckl. & Zeyh.) Urton (Rhoicissus cuneifolia (Eckl. & Zeyh.) Planch.)
 Cissus cornifolia (Bak.f.) Planch
 Cissus integrifolia (Baker) Planch.
 Cissus nymphaeifolia (Welw. ex Baker) Planch.
 Cissus quadrangularis L.
 Cissus rotundifolia (Forssk.) Vahl

Tiliaceae
 Sparrmannia africana L.f.
 Grewia avellana Hiern
 Grewia caffra Meisn.
 Grewia falcistipula K.Schum.
 Grewia flava DC.
 Grewia flavescens Juss.
 Grewia flavescens var. olukondae (Schinz) Wild
 Grewia forbesii Harv. ex Mast.
 Grewia gracillima Wild
 Grewia hexamita Burret
 Grewia hornbyi Wild
 Grewia inaequilatera Garcke
 Grewia lasiocarpa E. Mey ex Harv.
 Grewia lepidopetala Garcke
 Grewia micrantha Bojer
 Grewia microcarpa K.Schum.
 Grewia microthyrsa K. Schum. ex Burret
 Grewia monticola Sond.
 Grewia occidentalis L. (Grewia chirindae Baker f.)
 Grewia pachycalyx K.Schum.
 Grewia praecox K.Schum.
 Grewia retinervis Burret
 Grewia robusta Burch.
 Grewia schinzii K. Schum.
 Grewia stolzii Ulbr.
 Grewia subspathulata N.E.Br.
 Grewia sulcata Mast.
 Grewia tenax (Forssk.) Fiori
 Grewia transzambesica Wild
 Grewia truncata Mast.
 Grewia villosa Willd.

Malvaceae

 Hibiscus burtt-davyi Dunkley
 Hibiscus caesius Garcke
 Hibiscus calyphyllus Cav.
 Hibiscus castroi Baker f. & Exell
 Hibiscus diversifolius Jacq.
 Hibiscus dongolensis Caill. ex Delile
 Hibiscus micranthus L.f.
 Hibiscus mossambicensis Gonç.
 Hibiscus tiliaceus L.
 Thespesia acutiloba (Bak.f.) Exell & Mendonça
 Thespesia populnea (L.) Sol. ex Corrêa
 Azanza garckeana (F. Hoffm.) Exell & Hillc. (Thespesia garckeana F.Hoffm.)
 Gossypium anomalum Wawra & Peyr.
 Gossypium herbaceum L.
 Gossypium triphyllum (Haw.) Hochr.
 Adansonia digitata L.
 Rhodognaphalon schumannianum A.Robyns (Bombax rhodognaphalon K. Schum.)
 Dombeya autumnalis Verdoorn
 Dombeya burgessiae Gerr. ex Harv.
 Dombeya cymosa Harv.
 Dombeya kirkii Mast.
 Dombeya pulchra N.E. Br.
 Dombeya rotundifolia (Hochst.) Planch.
 Dombeya shupangae K.Schum.
 Dombeya tiliacea (Endl.) Planch.
 Triplochiton zambesiacus Milne-Redh.
 Sterculia africana (Lour.) Fiori
 Sterculia alexandri Harv.
 Sterculia appendiculata K. Schum.
 Sterculia murex Hemsl.
 Sterculia quinqueloba (Garcke) K. Schum.
 Sterculia rogersii N.E. Br.
 Cola greenwayi Brenan
 Cola mossambicensis Wild
 Cola natalensis Oliv.
 Heritiera littoralis Aiton
 Glyphaea tomentosa Mast.

Ochnaceae
 Ochna angustata N. Robson
 Ochna arborea Burch. ex DC.
 Ochna arborea Burch. var oconnorii (Phill.) Du Toit
 Ochna atropurpurea DC.
 Ochna barbertonensis T.Shah
 Ochna barbosae Robson
 Ochna beirensis N. Robson
 Ochna cinnabarina Engl. & Gilg
 Ochna gambleoides N.Robson
 Ochna glauca I. Verd.
 Ochna holstii Engl.
 Ochna inermis Schweinf.
 Ochna natalitia (Meisn.) Walp.
 Ochna polyneura Gilg
 Ochna pretoriensis Phill.
 Ochna puberula N. Robson
 Ochna pulchra Hook.
 Ochna rovumensis Gilg
 Ochna schweinfurthiana F.Hoffm.
 Ochna serrulata (Hochst.) Walp.
 Brackenridgea zanguebarica Oliv.

Hypericaceae

 Hypericum revolutum Vahl
 Hypericum roeperanum Schimp. ex A. Rich.
 Psorospermum febrifugum Spach

Clusiaceae (Guttiferae)
 Garcinia gerrardii Harv. ex Sim
 Garcinia huillensis Welw.
 Garcinia kingaensis Engl.
 Garcinia livingstonei T. Anders

Dipterocarpaceae
 Monotes engleri Gilg
 Monotes glaber Sprague
 Monotes katangensis (De Wild.) De Wild.

Tamaricaceae
 Tamarix usneoides E. Mey. ex Bunge

Canellaceae
 Warburgia salutaris (Bertol.f.) Chiov.

Violaceae
 Rinorea angustifolia (Thou.) Baill. (Rinorea natalensis Engl.)
 Rinorea arborea (Thouars) Baill.
 Rinorea convallarioides Eyles
 Rinorea domatiosa Van Wyk
 Rinorea elliptica (Oliv.) Kuntze
 Rinorea ferruginea Engl.
 Rinorea ilicifolia (Welw. ex Oliv.) Kuntze

Achariaceae
 Caloncoba suffruticosa (Milne-Redh.) Exell & Sleumer
 Lindackeria fragrans (Gilg) Gilg
 Rawsonia lucida Harv. & Sond.
 Xylotheca kraussiana Hochst.
 Xylotheca tettensis (Klotzsch) Gilg
 Kiggelaria africana L.

Aphloiaceae
 Aphloia theiformis (Vahl) Benn. (Neumannia theiformis (Vahl) A. Rich.)

Gerrardinaceae
 Gerrardina foliosa Oliv.

Passifloraceae
 Adenia digitata (Harv.) Engl.
 Adenia glauca Schinz
 Adenia gummifera (Harv.) Harms
 Adenia hastata (Harv.) Schinz
 Adenia karibaensis W.J.de Wilde
 Adenia pechuelii (Engl.) Harms
 Adenia repanda (Burch.) Engl.
 Adenia spinosa Burtt Davy
 Turnera oculata Story

Penaeaceae
 Olinia chimanimani T. Shah & I. Darbysh.
 Olinia emarginata Burtt Davy
 Olinia radiata J. Hofmeyr & Phill.
 Olinia rochetiana A. Juss.
 Olinia vanguerioides Baker f.
 Olinia ventosa (L.) Cufod.
 Rhynchocalyx lawsonioides Oliv.

Thymelaeaceae
 Peddiea africana Harv.
 Peddiea dregei Meisn.
 Englerodaphne pilosa Burtt Davy
 Englerodaphne subcordata (Meisn.) Engl.
 Passerina falcifolia C.H. Wr.
 Passerina filiformis L.
 Passerina rigida Wikstr.
 Dais cotinifolia L.
 Synaptolepis alternifolia Oliv.
 Synaptolepis kirkii Oliv.

Lythraceae
  N.E. Br.
 Sonneratia alba Sm.
 Pemphis acidula J.R. Forst. & G. Forst.

Lecythidaceae
 Barringtonia racemosa (L.) Roxb.
 Napoleonaea imperialis P Beauv.

Rhizophoraceae
 Ceriops tagal (Perr.) C.B. Robinson
 Rhizophora mucronata Lam.
 Bruguiera gymnorhiza (L.) Lam.
 Cassipourea euryoides Alston
 Cassipourea flanaganii (Schinz) Alston
 Cassipourea gummiflua Tul.
 Cassipourea malosana (Bak.) Alston
 Cassipourea mossambicensis (v. Brehm.) Alston
 Cassipourea swaziensis Compton

Combretaceae

 Combretum adenogonium Steud. ex A.Rich.
 Combretum albopunctatum Suesseng.
 Combretum apiculatum Sond.
 Combretum apiculatum Sond. var leutweinii (Schinz) Exell
 Combretum bracteosum (Hochst.) Brandis
 Combretum caffrum (Eckl. & Zeyh.) Kuntze
 Combretum celastroides Welw. ex Laws.
 Combretum collinum Fresen. subsp. gazense (Swynn. & Bak.f.) Okafor
 Combretum collinum Fresen. subsp. ondongense (Engl. & Diels) Okafor
 Combretum collinum Fresen. subsp. suluense (Engl. & Diels) Okafor
 Combretum collinum Fresen. subsp. taborense (Engl.) Okafor
 Combretum constrictum (Benth.) M.A.Lawson
 Combretum edwardsii Exell
 Combretum elaeagnoides Klotzsch
 Combretum engleri Schinz
 Combretum erythrophyllum (Burch.) Sond.
 Combretum adenogonium Steud. ex A.Rich. (Combretum fragrans F.Hoffm.)
 Combretum hereroense Schinz
 Combretum holstii Engl.

 Combretum imberbe Wawra
 Combretum kirkii M.A.Lawson
 Combretum kraussii Hochst. (Combretum nelsonii Duemmer)
 Combretum microphyllum Klotzsch
 Combretum mkuzense J.D.Carr & Retief
 Combretum moggii Exell
 Combretum molle R. Br. ex G. Don (Combretum holosericeum Sond.)
 Combretum mossambicense (Klotzsch) Engl.
 Combretum obovatum F.Hoffm.
 Combretum oxystachyum Welw. ex M.A.Lawson
 Combretum padoides Engl. & Diels
 Combretum paniculatum Vent.
 Combretum petrophilum Retief
 Combretum pisoniiflorum (Klotzsch) Engl.
 Combretum platypetalum Welw. ex M.A.Lawson
 Combretum psidioides Welw.
 Combretum psidioides Welw. subsp. dinteri (Schinz) Engl.
 Combretum schumannii Engl.
 Combretum vendae A.E.van Wyk var. glabratum N.Hahn
 Combretum vendae Van Wyk var. vendae
 Combretum wattii Exell
 Combretum woodii Duemmer
 Combretum xanthothyrsum Engl. & Diels
 Combretum zeyheri Sond.
 Meiostemon tetrandrus (Exell) Exell & Stace
 Pteleopsis anisoptera (Laws.) Engl. & Diels
 Pteleopsis myrtifolia (Laws.) Engl. & Diels
 Quisqualis parviflora Gerr. ex Harv

 Terminalia boivinii Tul.
 Terminalia brachystemma Welw. ex Hiern
 Terminalia gazensis Baker f.
 Terminalia mollis M.A.Lawson
 Terminalia phanerophlebia Engl. & Diels
 Terminalia prunioides Laws.
 Terminalia randii Bak.f.
 Terminalia sambesiaca Engl. & Diels
 Terminalia sericea Burch. ex DC.
 Terminalia stenostachya Engl. & Diels
 Terminalia stuhlmannii Engl.
 Terminalia trichopoda Diels
 Lumnitzera racemosa Willd.

Myrtaceae
 Heteropyxis canescens Oliv.
 Heteropyxis dehniae Suesseng.
 Heteropyxis natalensis Harv.
 Eugenia capensis (Eckl. & Zeyh.) Harv. ex Sond.
 Eugenia capensis subsp. natalitia (Sond.) F.White
 Eugenia capensis subsp. nyassensis (Engl.) F.White
 Eugenia capensis subsp. zeyheri (Harv.) F.White
 Eugenia erythrophylla Strey
 Eugenia simii Dümmer (Eugenia capensis subsp. simii (Dummer) F.White)
 Eugenia verdoorniae A.E. van Wyk
 Eugenia woodii Duemmer
 Eugenia zuluensis Duemmer
 Syzygium cordatum Hochst. (Eugenia cordata (Hochst. ex Krauss) G.Lawson)
 Syzygium gerrardii (Harv. ex Hook.f.) Burtt Davy
 Syzygium guineense (Willd.) DC.
 Syzygium × intermedium Engl. & Brehmer
 Syzygium legatii Burtt Davy & Greenway
 Syzygium owariense (P.Beauv.) Benth. (Eugenia owariensis P.Beauv.)
 Syzygium pondoense Engl.
 Metrosideros angustifolia (L.) J.E. Sm.

Melastomataceae
 Warneckea sansibarica (Taub.) Jacq.-Fél.
 Memecylon bachmannii Engl.
 Memecylon erythranthum Gilg
 Memecylon grandiflorum A.Fern. & R.Fern.
 Memecylon myrianthum Gilg
 Memecylon natalense Markgr.
 Memecylon sansibaricum Taub. var. buchananii (Gilg) R. & A. Fernandes (Memecylon zanzibaricum Taub.)

Araliaceae
 Cussonia angolensis (Seem.) Hiern
 Cussonia arborea Hochst. ex A.Rich.
 Cussonia arenicola Strey
 Cussonia gamtoosensis Strey
 Cussonia natalensis Sond.
 Cussonia nicholsonii Strey
 Cussonia paniculata Eckl. & Zeyh.
 Cussonia paniculata Eckl. & Zeyh. subsp. sinuata (Reyneke & Kok) De Winter
 Cussonia sphaerocephala Strey
 Cussonia spicata Thunb.
 Cussonia thyrsiflora Thunb.
 Cussonia transvaalensis Reyneke
 Cussonia zuluensis Strey
 Schefflera umbellifera (Sond.) Baill.
 Schefflera volkensii (Harms) Harms
 Seemannaralia gerrardii (Seemann) Vig.
 Polyscias fulva (Hiern) Harms

Apiaceae (Umbelliferae)
 Heteromorpha arborescens (Spreng.) Cham. & Schltdl.
 Heteromorpha papillosa C.C.Towns.
 Heteromorpha stenophylla Welw. ex Schinz
 Heteromorpha trifoliata (Wendl.) Eckl. & Zeyh.
 Steganotaenia araliacea Hochst.

Curtisiaceae
 Curtisia dentata (Burm.f.) C.A. Sm.

Cornaceae
 Cornus volkensii Harms (Afrocrania volkensii (Harms) Hutch.)

Ericaceae

 Vaccinium exul H. Bol.
 Erica benguelensis (Welw. ex Engl.) E.G.H.Oliv. (Philippia benguellensis (Welw. ex Engl.) Britten)
 Erica caffra L.
 Erica caffrorum H. Bol.
 Erica canaliculata Andrews
 Erica caterviflora Salisb.
 Erica hexandra (S.Moore) E.G.H.Oliv. (Philippia hexandra S. Moore)
 Erica inconstans Zahlbr.
 Erica mannii (Hook.f.) Beentje (Philippia pallidiflora Engl.)
 Erica pleiotricha S.Moore (Erica thryptomenoides S.Moore)
 Erica simii (S. Moore) E.G.H. Oliver (Erica drakensbergensis L.Guthrie & Bolus)
 Erica triflora L.
 Erica tristis Bartl.
 Philippia chamissonis Klotzsch
 Philippia simii S. Moore

Myrsinaceae

 Maesa lanceolata Forssk.
 Myrsine africana L.
 Myrsine pillansii Adamson
 Rapanea gilliana (Sond.) Mez
 Rapanea melanophloeos (L.) Mez

Sapotaceae
 Sideroxylon inerme L.
 Chrysophyllum gorungosanum Engl.
 Chrysophyllum viridifolium J.M.Wood & Franks
 Englerophytum magalismontanum (Sond.) T.D.Penn. (Bequaertiodendron magalismontanum (Sond.) Heine & Hemsl.)
 Englerophytum natalense (Sond.) T.D.Penn.
 Synsepalum brevipes (Baker) T.D.Penn. (Pachystela brevipes (Baker) Baill. ex Engl.)
 Synsepalum kassneri (Engl.) T.D.Penn. (Tulestea kassneri (Engl.) Aubrév.)
 Pouteria adolfi-friedericii (Engl.) A.Meeuse (Aningeria adolfi-friedericii (Engl.) Robyns & Gilbert)
 Mimusops caffra E. Mey. ex A. DC.
 Mimusops fruticosa A. DC.
 Mimusops obovata Sond.
 Mimusops obtusifolia Lam.
 Mimusops zeyheri Sond.
 Manilkara concolor (Harv. ex C.H. Wr.) Gerstn.
 Manilkara discolor (Sond.) J.H. Hemsl.
 Manilkara mochisia (Bak.) Dubard
 Manilkara nicholsonii Van Wyk
 Vitellariopsis dispar (N.E. Br.) Aubrév.
 Vitellariopsis marginata (N.E. Br.) Aubrév. (Vitellariopsis sylvestris (S.Moore) Aubrév.)
 Inhambanella henriquezii (Engl. & Warb.) Dubard

Ebenaceae

 Euclea asperrima E.Holzh.
 Euclea coriacea A. DC.
 Euclea crispa (Thunb.) Guerke
 Euclea crispa (Thunb.) Guerke subsp. linearis (Zeyh. ex Hiern) F.White
 Euclea crispa (Thunb.) Guerke subsp. ovata  (Burch.) F.White
 Euclea divinorum Hiern
 Euclea natalensis A. DC.
 Euclea natalensis A. DC. subsp. capensis F. White
 Euclea natalensis A. DC. subsp. rotundifolia F. White
 Euclea pseudebenus E. Mey ex A. DC.
 Euclea racemosa L.
 Euclea racemosa L. subsp. daphnoides (Hiern) F.White
 Euclea racemosa subsp. schimperi (A.DC.) F.White (Euclea schimperi (A.DC.) Dandy)
 Euclea tomentosa E. Mey. ex A. DC.
 Euclea undulata Thunb. (Euclea undulata var. myrtina (Burch.) Hiern)
 Diospyros abyssinica (Hiern) F.White
 Diospyros acocksii (De Winter) De Winter
 Diospyros batocana Hiern
 Diospyros chamaethamnus Mildbr.
 Diospyros dichrophylla (Gand.) De Winter
 Diospyros galpinii (Hiern) De Winter
 Diospyros glabra (L.) De Winter
 Diospyros inhacaensis F. White
 Diospyros loureiroana G.Don (Diospyros usambarensis F.White)
 Diospyros lycioides Desf.
 Diospyros lycioides Desf. subsp. guerkei (Kuntze) De Winter
 Diospyros lycioides Desf. subsp. sericea (Bernh.) De Winter
 Diospyros mespiliformis Hochst. ex A. DC.
 Diospyros natalensis (Harv.) Brenan
 Diospyros natalensis (Harv.) Brenan subsp. nummularia (Brenan) F. White
 Diospyros pallens (Thunb.) F.White (Royena pallens Thunb.)
 Diospyros quiloensis (Hiern) F.White
 Diospyros ramulosa (E.Mey. ex A.DC.) De Winter
 Diospyros rotundifolia Hiern
 Diospyros scabrida (Harv. ex Hiern) De Winter
 Diospyros senensis Klotzsch
 Diospyros simii (Kuntze) De Winter
 Diospyros squarrosa Klotzsch
 Diospyros vera (Lour.) A.Chev. (Diospyros ferrea (Willd.) Bakh.)
 Diospyros villosa (L.) De Winter
 Diospyros virgata (Gürke) Brenan
 Diospyros whyteana (Hiern) F. White

Oleaceae
 Schrebera alata (Hochst.) Welw. (Schrebera mazoensis S.Moore)
 Schrebera trichoclada Welw.
 Chionanthus battiscombei (Hutch.) Stearn (Linociera battiscombei Hutch.)
 Chionanthus foveolatus (E. Mey.) Stearn (Linociera foveolata (E.Mey.) Knobl.)
 Chionanthus foveolatus (E. Mey.) Stearn subsp. major (Verdoorn) Stearn
 Chionanthus foveolatus (E. Mey.) Stearn subsp. tomentellus (Verdoorn) Stearn
 Chionanthus peglerae (C.H. Wr.) Stearn
 Olea europaea subsp. cuspidata (Wall. ex G. Don) Cif. (Olea africana Mill.)
 Olea capensis L.
 Olea capensis L. subsp. enervis (Harv. ex C.H. Wr.) Verdoorn
 Olea capensis L. subsp. macrocarpa (C.H. Wr.) Verdoorn
 Olea exasperata Jacq.
 Olea woodiana Knobl.
 Jasminum stenolobum Rolfe

Salvadoraceae
 Salvadora angustifolia Turrell var. australis (Schweick.) Verdoorn
 Salvadora persica L.
 Azima tetracantha Lam.

Loganiaceae
 Strychnos cocculoides Bak.
 Strychnos decussata (Pappe) Gilg
 Strychnos henningsii Gilg
 Strychnos innocua Delile
 Strychnos madagascariensis Poir.
 Strychnos mellodora S. Moore
 Strychnos mitis S. Moore
 Strychnos potatorum L.f.
 Strychnos pungens Solered.
 Strychnos spinosa Lam.
 Strychnos usambarensis Gilg ex Engl.

Gentianaceae
 Anthocleista grandiflora Gilg

Stilbaceae
 Halleria elliptica L.
 Halleria lucida L.
 Halleria ovata Benth.
 Nuxia congesta R. Br. ex Fresen. (Lachnopylis sambesina (Gilg) C.A.Sm.)
 Nuxia floribunda Benth.
 Nuxia glomerulata (C.A. Sm.) Verdoorn
 Nuxia oppositifolia (Hochst.) Benth.
 Anastrabe integerrima E.Mey. ex Benth.
 Bowkeria cymosa MacOwan
 Bowkeria verticillata (Eckl. & Zeyh.) Druce

Apocynaceae

 Landolphia capensis Oliv.
 Landolphia kirkii Dyer
 Saba comorensis (Bojer ex A.DC.) Pichon (Landolphia comorensis (Bojer ex A.DC.) K.Schum.)
 Acokanthera oblongifolia (Hochst.) Codd
 Acokanthera oppositifolia (Lam.) Codd
 Acokanthera rotundata (Codd) Kupicha
 Acokanthera schimperi (A.DC.) Schweinf.
 Carissa bispinosa (L.) Desf. ex Brenan (Carissa bispinosa var. acuminata (E.Mey.) Codd) (Carissa wyliei N.E.Br.)
 Carissa haematocarpa (Eckl.) A. DC.
 Carissa macrocarpa (Eckl.) A. DC.
 Carissa spinarum L.  (Carissa edulis (Forssk.) Vahl)
 Pleiocarpa pycnantha (K.Schum.) Stapf
 Gonioma kamassi E. Mey
 Holarrhena pubescens (Buch.-Ham.) Wall.
 Diplorhynchus condylocarpon (Muell. Arg.) Pichon (Diplorhynchus mossambicensis Benth.)
 Tabernaemontana elegans Stapf
 Tabernaemontana pachysiphon Stapf (Tabernaemontana angolensis Stapf)
 Tabernaemontana ventricosa Hochst. ex A. DC.
 Ephippiocarpa orientalis (S. Moore) Markgr.
 Voacanga africana Stapf ex Scott-Elliot (Voacanga schweinfurthii Stapf)
 Voacanga thouarsii Roem. & Schult.
 Rauvolfia caffra Sond. (Rauvolfia inebrians K.Schum.)
 Baissea wulfhorstii Schinz
 Oncinotis inandensis Wood & Evans
 Hunteria zeylanica (Retz.) Gardner ex Thwaites
 Mascarenhasia arborescens A.DC.
 Funtumia africana (Benth.) Stapf
 Strophanthus amboensis (Schinz) Engl. & Pax
 Strophanthus courmontii Sacleux ex Franch.
 Strophanthus gerrardii Stapf
 Strophanthus kombe Oliv.
 Strophanthus petersianus Klotzsch

 Strophanthus speciosus (Ward & Harv.) Reber
 Adenium boehmianum Schinz
 Adenium multiflorum Klotzsch
 Adenium obesum (Forssk.) Roem. & Schult.
 Pachypodium lealii Welw.
 Pachypodium namaquanum (Wyley ex Harv.) Welw.
 Wrightia natalensis Stapf
 Cryptolepis decidua (Planch. ex Hook.f. & Benth.) N.E.Br.
 Ectadium latifolium (Schinz) N.E.Br.
 Ectadium rotundifolium (H.Huber) Venter & Kotze
 Ectadium virgatum E.Mey.
 Fockea multiflora K.Schum.
 Gomphocarpus fruticosus (L.) W.T.Aiton
 Gomphocarpus tomentosus Burch.
 Tacazzea apiculata Oliv.
 Mondia whitei (Hook.f.) Skeels

Convolvulaceae
 Ipomoea adenioides Schinz
 Ipomoea shirambensis Baker
 Ipomoea verbascoidea Choisy

Boraginaceae
 Cordia africana Lam.
 Cordia caffra Sond.
 Cordia goetzei Gürke
 Cordia grandicalyx Oberm.
 Cordia monoica Roxb.
 Cordia ovalis R. Br.
 Cordia pilosissima Bak.
 Cordia sinensis Lam.
 Cordia stuhlmannii Gürke
 Cordia torrei E.S.Martins
 Ehretia alba Retief & A.E.van Wyk
 Ehretia amoena Klotzsch
 Ehretia coerulea Gürke
 Ehretia cymosa Thonn.
 Ehretia namibiensis Retief & A.E.van Wyk
 Ehretia obtusifolia Hochst. ex DC.
 Ehretia rigida (Thunb.) Druce
 Lobostemon belliformis Buys
 Heliotropium foertherianum Diane & Hilger

Verbenaceae
 Lantana angolensis Moldenke
 Lantana camara L.
 Lantana dinteri Moldenke
 Lantana rugosa Thunb.

Lamiaceae
 Premna mooiensis (H. Pearson) Pieper
 Premna senensis Klotzsch
 Vitex angolensis Gürke
 Vitex buchananii Baker ex Gürke
 Vitex doniana Sweet
 Vitex ferruginea Schumach. & Thonn. (Vitex amboniensis Gürke)
 Vitex harveyana H.H.W. Pearson
 Vitex madiensis Oliv.
 Vitex mombassae Vatke
 Vitex obovata E. Mey. (Vitex wilmsii Gürke)
 Vitex payos (Lour.) Merr. (Vitex isotjensis Gibbs)
 Vitex petersiana Klotzsch (Vitex kirkii Baker)
 Vitex pooara Corbishley
 Vitex rehmannii Guerke
 Vitex zeyheri Sond. ex Schauer
 Clerodendrum umbellatum Poir.
 Rotheca myricoides (Hochst.) Steane & Mabb. (Clerodendrum myricoides (Hochst.) Vatke)<
 Rotheca wildii (Moldenke) R. Fern.
 Volkameria eriophylla (Gürke) Mabb. & Y.W.Yuan (Clerodendrum eriophyllum Gürke)
 Volkameria glabra (E.Mey.) Mabb. & Y.W.Yuan (Clerodendrum glabrum E. Mey.)
 Karomia speciosa (Hutch. & Corbishley) R.Fern. (Holmskioldia speciosa Hutch. & Corb.)
 Tetradenia riparia (Hochst.) Codd
 Tinnea rhodesiana S.Moore
 Syncolostemon albiflorus (N.E.Br.) D.F.Otieno (Hemizygia albiflora (N.E.Br.) Ashby)
 Syncolostemon flabellifolius (S.Moore) A.J.Paton (Hemizygia flabellifolia S.Moore)
 Hemizygia obermeyerae Ashby
 Hoslundia opposita Vahl

Solanaceae
 Datura ferox L.
 Datura innoxia Mill.
 Datura stramonium L.
 Lycium afrum L.
 Lycium bosciifolium Schinz
 Lycium cinereum Thunb.
 Lycium decumbens Welw. ex Hiern
 Lycium eenii S. Moore
 Lycium ferocissimum Miers
 Lycium grandicalyx Joubert & Venter
 Lycium hirsutum Dunal
 Lycium oxycarpum Dunal
 Lycium persicum Miers
 Lycium prunus-spinosa Dunal
 Lycium villosum Schinz
 Solanum aculeastrum Dunal
 Solanum giganteum Jacq.
 Nicotiana glauca Graham
 Withania somnifera (L.) Dunal

Scrophulariaceae

 Buddleja auriculata Benth.
 Buddleja dysophylla (Benth.) Radlk.
 Buddleja glomerata H.L.Wendl.
 Buddleja loricata Leeuwenb. (Buddleja corrugata (Benth.) Phillips)
 Buddleja pulchella N.E. Br.
 Buddleja saligna Willd.
 Buddleja salviifolia (L.) Lam.
 Freylinia lanceolata (L.f.) G. Don
 Freylinia tropica S. Moore
 Antherothamnus pearsonii N.E.Br.
 Manuleopsis dinteri Thell. ex Schinz
 Jamesbrittenia ramosissima (Hiern) Hilliard

Bignoniaceae
 Podranea brycei (N.E.Br.) Sprague
 Podranea ricasoliana (Tanf.) Sprague
 Tecoma capensis (Thunb.) Lindl. (Tecomaria capensis (Thunb.) Spach)
 Rhigozum brevispinosum Kuntze
 Rhigozum obovatum Burch.
 Rhigozum trichotomum Burch.
 Rhigozum virgatum Merxm. & A.Schreib.
 Rhigozum zambesiacum Bak.
 Markhamia obtusifolia (Baker) Sprague
 Markhamia zanzibarica (Bojer ex DC.) K.Schum. (Markhamia acuminata (Klotzsch) K. Schum.)
 Kigelia africana (Lam.) Benth.
 Fernandoa abbreviata Bidgood
 Fernandoa ferdinandi (Welw.) Baill. ex K.Schum.
 Fernandoa magnifica Seem.
 Catophractes alexandri D.Don
 Stereospermum kunthianum Cham.
 Dolichandrone alba (Sim) Sprague

Pedaliaceae
 Sesamothamnus benguellensis Welw.
 Sesamothamnus guerichii (Engl.) E.A. Bruce
 Sesamothamnus lugardii N.E. Br.
 Sesamum rigidum Peyr.

Acanthaceae

 Monechma genistifolium C.B.Clarke
 Monechma tonsum P.G. Mey.
 Sclerochiton harveyanus Nees
 Sclerochiton kirkii (T. Anderson) C.B. Clarke
 Barleria prionitis L.
 Mackaya bella Harv.
 Thunbergia crispa Burkill
 Justicia adhatodoides (Nees) V.A.W.Graham (Duvernoia adhatodoides E. Mey. ex Nees)
 Petalidium englerianum C.B.Clarke
 Petalidium luteo-album A.Meeuse
 Avicennia marina (Forssk.) Vierh.
 Anisotes sessiliflorus (T.Anderson) C.B.Clarke
 Ruspolia hypocrateriformis (Vahl) Milne-Redh.

Rubiaceae
 Nauclea diderrichii (De Wild.) Merr.
 Sherbournia bignoniiflora (Welw.) Hua
 Stipularia africana P.Beauv.
 Amphiasma benguellense (Hiern) Bremek.
 Amphiasma merenskyanum Bremek.
 Hymenodictyon floribundum (Hochst. & Steud.) B.L.Rob.
 Hymenodictyon parvifolium Oliv.
 Crossopteryx febrifuga (Afzel. ex G. Don) Benth.
 Breonadia salicina (Vahl) Hepper & Wood (Adina microcephala (Delile) Hiern)
 Cephalanthus natalensis Oliv.
 Pauridiantha symplocoides (S.Moore) Bremek.
 Leptactina benguelensis (Welw. ex Benth. & Hook.f.) R.D.Good
 Leptactina platyphylla (Hiern) Wernham (Leptactina hexamera K.Schum.)
 Tarenna junodii (Schinz) Bremek.
 Tarenna luteola (Stapf) Bremek.
 Tarenna pallidula Hiern (Tarenna laurentii (De Wild.) J.G.García)
 Tarenna pavettoides (Harv.) Sim
 Coptosperma littorale (Hiern) Degreef (Tarenna littoralis (Hiern) Bridson)
 Coptosperma neurophyllum (S.Moore) Degreef (Tarenna neurophylla (S.Moore) Bremek.)
 Coptosperma rhodesiacum (Bremek.) Degreef (Tarenna zimbabwensis Bridson)
 Coptosperma supra-axillare (Hemsl.) Degreef (Tarenna supra-axillaris (Hemsl.) Bremek.)(Tarenna barbertonensis (Bremek.) Bremek.) 
 Coptosperma zygoon (Bridson) Degreef
 Burchellia bubalina (L.f.) Sims.
 Catunaregam obovata (Hochst.) A.E.Gonç.
 Catunaregam pentandra (Gürke) Bridson
 Catunaregam spinosa (Thunb.) Tirveng.
 Catunaregam stenocarpa Bridson
 Catunaregam swynnertonii (S.Moore) Bridson (Randia swynnertonii S.Moore)
 Catunaregam taylorii (S.Moore) Bridson
 Coddia rudis (E. Mey. ex Harv.) Verdc. (Xeromphis rudis (E.Mey. ex Harv.) Codd)
 Mitriostigma axillare Hochst.
 Hyperacanthus amoenus (Sims.) Bridson (Gardenia amoena Sims)
 Gardenia cornuta Hemsl.
 Gardenia imperialis K.Schum.
 Gardenia posoquerioides S.Moore
 Gardenia resiniflua Hiern
 Gardenia ternifolia Schum. & Thonn. subsp. jovis-tonantis (Welw.) Verdc. (Gardenia jovis-tonantis (Welw.) Hiern)
 Gardenia thunbergia L.f.
 Gardenia volkensii K. Schum.
 Gardenia volkensii K. Schum. subsp. spathulifolia (Stapf & Hutch.) Verdc.
 Rothmannia capensis Thunb.
 Rothmannia engleriana (K.Schum.) Keay
 Rothmannia fischeri (K. Schum.) Bullock
 Rothmannia globosa (Hochst.) Keay
 Rothmannia manganjae (Hiern) Keay
 Rothmannia urcelliformis (Hiern) Bullock ex Robyns
 Rothmannia whitfieldii (Lindl.) Dandy
 Didymosalpinx norae (Swynn.) Keay
 Oxyanthus latifolius Sond.
 Oxyanthus pyriformis (Hochst.) Skeels
 Oxyanthus speciosus DC. subsp. gerrardii (Sond.) Bridson
 Feretia aeruginescens Stapf
 Tricalysia angolensis A.Rich. ex DC.
 Tricalysia capensis (Meisn.) Sim
 Tricalysia congesta (Oliv.) Hiern
 Tricalysia coriacea subsp. nyassae (Hiern) Bridson (Tricalysia nyassae Hiern)
 Tricalysia jasminiflora (Klotzsch) Benth. & Hook.f. ex Hiern (Neorosea jasminiflora (Klotzsch) N.Hallé)
 Empogona coriacea (Sond.) Tosh & Robbr. (Tricalysia sonderiana Hiern)
 Empogona kirkii Hook.f. (Tricalysia allenii (Stapf) Brenan)
 Empogona kirkii subsp. junodii (Schinz) Tosh & Robbr. (Tricalysia junodii (Schinz) Brenan)
 Empogona lanceolata (Sond.) Tosh & Robbr. (Tricalysia lanceolata (Sond.) Burtt Davy)
 Kraussia floribunda Harv.
 Sericanthe andongensis (Hiern) Robbr. (Neorosea andongensis (Hiern) N.Hallé) (Tricalysia pachystigma K.Schum.)
 Heinsia crinita (Afzel.) G.Taylor
 Heinsenia diervilleoides K.Schum. (Aulacocalyx diervilleoides (K.Schum.) E.M.A.Petit)
 Cremaspora triflora (Thonn.) K.Schum.
 Polysphaeria lanceolata Hiern
 Alberta magna E. Mey
 Vangueria apiculata K.Schum. (Vangueria longicalyx Robyns)
 Vangueria cyanescens Robyns
 Vangueria dryadum S.Moore (Lagynias dryadum (S.Moore) Robyns)
 Vangueria esculenta S. Moore
 Vangueria infausta Burch. (Vangueria tomentosa Hochst.)
 Vangueria lasiantha (Sond.) Sond. (Lagynias lasiantha (Sond.) Bullock)
 Vangueria macrocalyx Sond. (Pachystigma macrocalyx (Sond.) Robyns)
 Vangueria monteiroi (Oliv.) Lantz (Ancylanthus monteiroi Oliv.)
 Vangueria parvifolia Sond. (Tapiphyllum parvifolium (Sond.) Robyns)
 Vangueria proschii Briq.
 Vangueria randii S. Moore subsp. chartacea (Robyns) Verdc.
 Vangueria soutpansbergensis N.Hahn
 Vangueria triflora (Robyns) Lantz (Pachystigma triflorum Robyns)
 Vangueria zambesiaca Lantz (Tapiphyllum velutinum Robyns)
 Vangueriopsis lanciflora (Hiern) Robyns ex Good
 Lagynias lasiantha (Sond.) Bullock
 Afrocanthium burttii (Bullock) Lantz (Canthium burttii Bullock)
 Afrocanthium gilfillanii (N.E.Br.) Lantz (Canthium gilfillanii (N.E.Br.) O.B.Mill.)
 Afrocanthium lactescens (Hiern) Lantz (Canthium lactescens Hiern)
 Afrocanthium mundianum (Cham. & Schltdl.) Lantz (Canthium mundianum Cham. & Schltdl.)
 Afrocanthium pseudoverticillatum (S.Moore) Lantz (Canthium pseudoverticillatum S.Moore)
 Afrocanthium racemulosum (S.Moore) Lantz (Canthium racemulosum S.Moore)
 Chazaliella abrupta (Hiern) E.M.A.Petit & Verdc. (Chazaliella abrupta var. abrupta)
 Bullockia setiflora (Hiern) Razafim., Lantz & B.Bremer (Canthium setiflorum Hiern)
 Canthium ciliatum  (D.Dietr.) Kuntze
 Canthium glaucum Hiern
 Canthium glaucum subsp. frangula (S.Moore) Bridson (Canthium frangula S.Moore)
 Canthium inerme (L.f.) Kuntze
 Canthium kuntzeanum Bridson (Canthium pauciflorum (Klotzsch ex Eckl. & Zeyh.) Kuntze)
 Canthium oligocarpum subsp. captum (Bullock) Bridson (Canthium captum Bullock)
 Canthium spinosum (Klotzsch ex Eckl. & Zeyh.) Kuntze
 Canthium suberosum Codd
 Psydrax livida (Hiern) Bridson (Canthium huillense Hiern)
 Psydrax locuples (K. Schum.) Bridson (Canthium locuples (K.Schum.) Codd)
 Psydrax martini (Dunkley) Bridson (Canthium martini Dunkley)
 Psydrax obovata (Eckl. & Zeyh.) Bridson (Canthium obovatum Klotzsch ex Eckl. & Zeyh.)
 Psydrax obovata (Eckl. & Zeyh.) Bridson subsp. elliptica Bridson
 Psydrax parviflora (Afzel.) Bridson (Canthium vulgare (K.Schum.) Bullock)
 Keetia gueinzii (Sond.) Bridson (Canthium gueinzii Sond.)
 Keetia venosa (Oliv.) Bridson (Canthium venosum (Oliv.) Hiern)
 Pyrostria bibracteata (Baker) Cavaco
 Pyrostria hystrix (Bremek.) Bridson (Dinocanthium hystrix Bremek.)
 Plectroniella armata (K. Schum.) Robyns
 Craterispermum schweinfurthii Hiern
 Coffea eugenioides S.Moore
 Coffea racemosa Lour.
 Coffea zanguebariae Lour.
 Guettarda speciosa L.
 Pavetta andongensis Hiern
 Pavetta cataractarum S.Moore
 Pavetta edentula Sond.
 Pavetta eylesii S. Moore
 Pavetta gardeniifolia A. Rich.
 Pavetta gardeniifolia A. Rich. var. subtomentosa K. Schum.
 Pavetta gerstneri Bremek.
 Pavetta harborii S.Moore
 Pavetta inandensis Bremek.
 Pavetta johnstonii Bremek.
 Pavetta klotzschiana K.Schum.
 Pavetta kotzei Bremek.
 Pavetta lanceolata Eckl.
 Pavetta natalensis Sond.
 Pavetta pumila N.E.Br. (geoxyle)
 Pavetta revoluta Hochst.
 Pavetta schumanniana F. Hoffm. ex K. Schum.
 Pavetta umtalensis Bremek.
 Pavetta zeyheri Sond.
 Psychotria capensis (Eckl.) Vatke
 Psychotria mahonii C.H.Wright
 Psychotria zombamontana (Kuntze) Petit
 Dirichletia pubescens Klotzsch
 Rytigynia uhligii (K.Schum. & K.Krause) Verdc. (Rytigynia schumannii Robyns)
 Rytigynia umbellulata (Hiern) Robyns
 Lasianthus kilimandscharicus K.Schum.
 Mussaenda arcuata Poir.

Cucurbitaceae
 Acanthosicyos horridus Welw. ex Hook.f.
 Gerrardanthus lobatus (Cogn.) C.Jeffrey

Asteraceae

 Pluchea dioscoridis (L.) DC.
 Vernonia amygdalina Del. (Vernonia randii S.Moore)
 Vernonia calvoana subsp. leucocalyx (O.Hoffm.) C.Jeffrey (Vernonia leucocalyx O.Hoffm.)
 Vernonia colorata (Willd.) Drake
 Vernonia stipulacea Klatt
 Orbivestus cinerascens (Sch.Bip.) H.Rob. (Vernonia cinerascens Sch.Bip.)
 Gymnanthemum coloratum (Willd.) H.Rob. & B.Kahn (Vernonia colorata (Willd.) Drake)
 Gymnanthemum mespilifolium (Less.) H.Rob.
 Gymnanthemum myrianthum (Hook.f.) H.Rob. (Vernonia stipulacea Klatt)
 Brachylaena discolor DC.
 Brachylaena discolor DC. subsp. transvaalensis (Phill. & Schweick.) J. Paiva
 Brachylaena elliptica (Thunb.) DC.
 Brachylaena glabra (L.f.) Druce
 Brachylaena huillensis O. Hoffm.
 Brachylaena ilicifolia (Lam.) Phill. & Schweick.
 Brachylaena neriifolia (L.) R. Br.
 Brachylaena rotundata S. Moore (Brachylaena rhodesiana S.Moore)
 Brachylaena transvaalensis Hutch. ex E.Phillips & Schweick (Brachylaena discolor subsp. transvaalensis (Hutch. ex Phillips & Schweick.) Paiva)
 Brachylaena uniflora Harv.
 Tarchonanthus camphoratus L.
 Tarchonanthus littoralis P.P.J.Herman
 Tarchonanthus obovatus DC.
 Tarchonanthus parvicapitulatus P.P.J.Herman
 Tarchonanthus trilobus DC.
 Tarchonanthus trilobus DC. var. galpinii (Hutch. & Phill.) J. Paiva
 Metalasia muricata (L.) D.Don.
 Chrysanthemoides monilifera (L.) Norl.
 Artemisia afra Jacq. ex Willd.
 Phymaspermum athanasioides (S.Moore) Källersjö (Brachymeris athanasioides (S.Moore) Hutch.)
 Lopholaena coriifolia (Sond.) Phill. & Sm.
 Lopholaena platyphylla Benth.
 Senecio barbertonicus (Klatt.) Burtt Davy
 Euryops chrysanthemoides (DC.) B.Nord.
 Euryops subcarnosus DC.
 Euryops virgineus (L.f.) DC.
 Didelta spinosa (L.f.) Ait.
 Oldenburgia grandis (Thunb.) Baill. (Oldenburgia arbuscula DC.)
 Distephanus angolensis (O.Hoffm.) H.Rob. & B.Kahn
 Distephanus divaricatus (Steetz) H.Rob. & B.Kahn
 Pechuel-loeschea leubnitziae (Kuntze) O.Hoffm.
 Psiadia punctulata (DC.) Vatke
 Solanecio mannii (Hook.f.) C.Jeffrey (Crassocephalum mannii (Hook.f.) Milne-Redh.)

External links
Flora of Zambia
Flora of Zimbabwe
Flora of Mozambique
Flora of Zambia
SANBI/PlantZAfrica
Plants of Southern Africa - An Online Checklist
Namibian Tree Atlas
A reconnaissance survey of the woody flora and vegetation of the Catapú logging concession, Cheringoma District, Mozambique

References

The Plant List (Kew)
Tree Atlas of Namibia
A Preliminary List of Trees, Shrubs and Lianes of Transvaal and Swaziland - J. M. Anderson, P. A. Venter (1977)
Trees of Southern Africa - Keith Coates Palgrave (1977)
Field Guide to Trees of Southern Africa - van Wyk & van Wyk (1997)
Trees of Natal, Zululand and Transkei - Elsa Pooley (1993)
Trees and Shrubs of the Witwatersrand - Tree Society (1964)
Forest Flora of Northern Rhodesia - F. White (OUP, 1962)

Trees
 Trees
.Southern
.
African, southern